

Deaths in August

15: Rick Rypien
17: Pierre Quinon
28: Len Ganley

Current sporting seasons

Australian rules football 2011

Australian Football League

Auto racing 2011

Formula One
Sprint Cup
Nationwide Series
Camping World Truck Series
IRL IndyCar Series
World Rally Championship
WTTC
V8 Supercar
Formula Two
GP2 Series
GP3 Series
American Le Mans
Le Mans Series
Rolex Sports Car Series
FIA GT1 World Championship
Auto GP
World Series by Renault
Deutsche Tourenwagen Masters
Super GT

Baseball 2011

Major League Baseball
Nippon Professional Baseball

Basketball 2011

WNBA
Philippines collegiate:
NCAA
UAAP

Canadian football 2011

Canadian Football League

Cricket 2011

England:
County Championship
Clydesdale Bank 40
Friends Life t20

Football (soccer) 2011

National teams competitions
2014 FIFA World Cup qualification
UEFA Euro 2012 qualifying
2012 Africa Cup of Nations qualification
UEFA Women's Euro 2013 qualifying
International clubs competitions
UEFA (Europe) Champions League
UEFA Europa League
UEFA Women's Champions League
Copa Sudamericana
AFC (Asia) Champions League
AFC Cup
CAF (Africa) Champions League
CAF Confederation Cup
CONCACAF (North & Central America) Champions League
Domestic (national) competitions
Argentina
Brazil
England
France
Germany
Italy
Japan
Norway
Portugal
Russia
Scotland
Spain
Major League Soccer (USA & Canada)
Women's Professional Soccer (USA)

Golf 2011

PGA Tour
European Tour
LPGA Tour
Champions Tour

Motorcycle racing 2011

Moto GP
Superbike World Championship
Supersport World Championship

Rugby league 2011

Super League
NRL

Rugby union 2011

Top 14
Currie Cup
ITM Cup

Tennis 2011

ATP World Tour
WTA Tour

Volleyball 2011

National teams competitions
World Grand Prix

Winter sports

ISU Junior Grand Prix

Days of the month

August 31, 2011 (Wednesday)

Athletics
World Championships in Daegu, South Korea:
Women's 20 kilometres walk:  Olga Kaniskina  1:29:42  Liu Hong  1:30:00  Anisya Kirdyapkina  1:30:12
Kaniskina wins the event for the third successive time.

Basketball
EuroBasket in Lithuania:
Group A in Panevėžys:
 83–78 
 79–56 
 80–69 
Group B in Šiauliai:
 80–68 
 89–78 
 91–64 
Group C in Alytus:
 70–65 (OT) 
 76–67 
 84–79 
Group D in Klaipėda:
 59–81 
 67–59 
 73–64 
FIBA Americas Championship in Mar del Plata, Argentina:
Group A:
 89–92 
 57–69 
Standings: Dominican Republic, Brazil 4 points (2 games),  Venezuela 2 (2), Canada 1 (1).
Group B:
 101–55 
 86–51 
Standings: Puerto Rico, Argentina 4 points (2 games), Paraguay 2 (2), Uruguay 1 (1).

Cricket
Australia in Sri Lanka:
1st Test in Galle, day 1:  273 (86.4 overs); .
India in England:
Only T20 in Manchester:  165 (19.4/20 overs);  169/4 (19.3/20 overs). England win by 6 wickets.

Cycling
Grand Tours:
Vuelta a España, Stage 11:  David Moncoutié  4h 38' 00"  Beñat Intxausti  + 1' 18"  Luis León Sánchez  + 1' 18"
General classification (after stage 11): (1) Bradley Wiggins   42h 50' 41" (2) Chris Froome  + 7" (3) Vincenzo Nibali  + 11"

Football (soccer)
Copa Sudamericana Second stage, first leg: Lanús  2–2  Godoy Cruz

Tennis
Grand Slams:
US Open in New York City, United States, day 3:
Men's singles, first round:
Andy Murray  [4] def. Somdev Devvarman  7–6(5), 6–2, 6–3
Julien Benneteau  def. Nicolás Almagro  [10] 6–2, 6–4, 6–3
Women's Singles, second round:
Vera Zvonareva  [2] def. Kateryna Bondarenko  7–5, 3–6, 6–3
Maria Sharapova  [3] def. Anastasiya Yakimova  6–1, 6–1
Christina McHale  def. Marion Bartoli  [8] 7–6(2), 6–2
Samantha Stosur  [9] def. CoCo Vandeweghe  6–3, 6–4

August 30, 2011 (Tuesday)

Athletics
World Championships in Daegu, South Korea:
Women's pole vault:  Fabiana Murer  4.85m  Martina Strutz  4.80m  Svetlana Feofanova  4.75m
Men's discus throw:  Robert Harting  68.97m  Gerd Kanter  66.95m  Ehsan Haddadi  66.08m
Harting wins the event for the second successive time.
Women's heptathlon:  Tatyana Chernova  6880 points  Jessica Ennis  6751  Jennifer Oeser  6572
Men's 800 metres:  David Rudisha  1:43.91  Abubaker Kaki Khamis  1:44.41  Yuriy Borzakovskiy  1:44.49
Women's 3000 metres steeplechase:  Yuliya Zaripova  9:07.03  Habiba Ghribi  9:11.97  Milcah Chemos Cheywa  9:17.16
Men's 400 metres:  Kirani James  44.60  LaShawn Merritt  44.63  Kévin Borlée  44.90

Basketball
FIBA Americas Championship in Mar del Plata, Argentina:
Group A:
 90–60 
 92–83 
Group B:
 52–84 
 66–99

Football (soccer)
Copa Sudamericana Second stage, first leg:
Arsenal  2–0  Estudiantes
Nacional  1–1  Aurora

Tennis
Grand Slams:
US Open in New York City, United States, day 2:
Men's singles, first round:
Novak Djokovic  [1] def. Conor Niland  6–0, 5–1 ret.
Rafael Nadal  [2] def. Andrey Golubev  6–3, 7–6(1), 7–5
David Ferrer  [5] def. Igor Andreev  2–6, 6–3, 6–0, 6–4
Women's singles, first round:
Caroline Wozniacki  [1] def. Nuria Llagostera Vives  6–3, 6–1
Victoria Azarenka  [4] def. Johanna Larsson  6–1, 6–3
Simona Halep  def. Li Na  [6] 6–2, 7–5
Francesca Schiavone  [7] def. Galina Voskoboeva  6–3, 1–6, 6–4
Andrea Petkovic  [10] def. Ekaterina Bychkova  6–2, 6–2

August 29, 2011 (Monday)

Athletics
World Championships in Daegu, South Korea:
Men's hammer throw:  Koji Murofushi  81.24m  Krisztián Pars  81.18m  Primož Kozmus  79.39m
Men's pole vault:  Paweł Wojciechowski  5.90m  Lázaro Borges  5.90m  Renaud Lavillenie  5.85m
Women's shot put:  Valerie Adams  21.24m (CR)  Nadzeya Astapchuk  20.05m  Jillian Camarena-Williams  20.02m
Adams wins the event for the third successive time.
Women's 400 metres:  Amantle Montsho  49.56  Allyson Felix  49.59  Anastasiya Kapachinskaya  50.24
Men's 110 metres hurdles:  Jason Richardson  13.16  Liu Xiang  13.27  Andy Turner  13.44
Dayron Robles  initially wins the race, but is disqualified for obstruction of Liu over the last hurdle.
Women's 100 metres:  Carmelita Jeter  10.90  Veronica Campbell-Brown  10.97  Kelly-Ann Baptiste  10.98
Jeter wins her second world championship title.
Women's heptathlon (standings after 4 events): (1) Jessica Ennis  4078 points (2) Tatyana Chernova  3927 (3) Hyleas Fountain  3887

Cycling
Grand Tours:
Vuelta a España, Stage 10:  Tony Martin  55' 54"  Chris Froome  + 59"  Bradley Wiggins  + 1' 22"
General classification (after stage 10): (1) Froome  38h 09' 13" (2) Jakob Fuglsang  + 12" (3) Wiggins + 20"

Tennis
Grand Slams:
US Open in New York City, United States, day 1:
Men's singles, first round:
Roger Federer  [3] def. Santiago Giraldo  6–4 6–3 6–2
Gaël Monfils  [7] def. Grigor Dimitrov  7–6(4) 6–3 6–4
Mardy Fish  [8] def. Tobias Kamke  6–2 6–2 6–1
Tomáš Berdych  [9] def. Romain Jouan  6–2 7–6(4) 6–1
Women's singles, first round:
Vera Zvonareva  [2] def. Stéphanie Foretz Gacon  6–3 6–0
Maria Sharapova  [3] def. Heather Watson  3–6 7–5 6–3
Alexandra Dulgheru  def. Petra Kvitová  [5] 7–6(3) 6–3
Marion Bartoli  [8] def. Alexandra Panova  7–5 6–3
Samantha Stosur  [9] def. Sofia Arvidsson  6–2 6–3

Surfing
Men's World Tour:
Billabong Pro Teahupoo in Teahupoo, Tahiti, French Polynesia: (1) Kelly Slater  (2) Owen Wright  (3) Josh Kerr  & Travis Logie 
Standings (after 5 of 11 events): (1) Slater 26,950 points (2) Smith 26,500 (3) Joel Parkinson  26,200

August 28, 2011 (Sunday)

Athletics
World Championships in Daegu, South Korea:
Men's 20 kilometres walk:  Valeriy Borchin  1:19:56  Vladimir Kanaykin  1:20:27  Luis Fernando López  1:20:38
Borchin wins the event for the second successive time.
Women's long jump:  Brittney Reese  6.82m  Olga Kucherenko  6.77m  Ineta Radēviča  6.76m
Reese wins the event for the second successive time.
Women's discus throw:  Li Yanfeng  66.52m  Nadine Müller  65.97m  Yarelys Barrios  65.73m
Men's 10,000 metres:  Ibrahim Jeilan  27:13.81  Mo Farah  27:14.07  Imane Merga  27:19.14
Men's decathlon:  Trey Hardee  8607 points  Ashton Eaton  8505  Leonel Suárez  8501
Hardee wins the event for the second successive time.
Men's 100 metres:  Yohan Blake  9.92  Walter Dix  10.08  Kim Collins  10.09
World record holder and defending world champion Usain Bolt  was disqualified from the final for a false start.

Auto racing
Formula One:
 in Spa, Belgium: (1) Sebastian Vettel  (Red Bull–Renault) (2) Mark Webber  (Red Bull-Renault) (3) Jenson Button  (McLaren–Mercedes)
Drivers' championship standings (after 12 of 19 races): (1) Vettel 259 points (2) Webber 167 (3) Fernando Alonso  (Ferrari) 157
IndyCar Series:
Indy Grand Prix of Sonoma in Sonoma, California (all Team Penske): (1) Will Power  (2) Hélio Castroneves  (3) Ryan Briscoe 
Drivers' championship standings (after 14 of 18 races): (1) Dario Franchitti  (Chip Ganassi Racing) 475 points (2) Power 449 (3) Scott Dixon  (Chip Ganassi Racing) 400

Basketball
FIBA Africa Championship in Antananarivo, Madagascar:
Bronze medal game:   77–67 
Final:   56–67  
Tunisia win the title for the first time, and qualify for the 2012 Olympics.
Angola and Nigeria qualify for the FIBA World Olympic Qualifying Tournament.
FIBA Asia Championship for Women in Ōmura, Japan:
Bronze medal game:   83–56 
Final:   65–62  
China win the title for the 11th time, and qualify for the 2012 Olympics.
Korea and Japan qualify for the FIBA World Olympic Qualifying Tournament.

Cycling
Grand Tours:
Vuelta a España, Stage 9:  Dan Martin  4h 52' 14"  Bauke Mollema  s.t.  Juan José Cobo  + 3"
General classification (after stage 9): (1) Mollema  37h 11' 17"(2) Joaquim Rodríguez   + 1" (3) Vincenzo Nibali  + 9"
UCI World Tour:
GP Ouest-France:  Grega Bole  6h 32' 41"  Simon Gerrans  s.t.  Thomas Voeckler  s.t.
UCI World Tour standings (after 22 of 27 races): (1) Cadel Evans  574 points (2) Philippe Gilbert  568 (3) Alberto Contador  471

Equestrianism
European Eventing Championship in Luhmühlen, Germany:
individual:  Michael Jung  on Sam FBW  Sandra Auffarth  on Opgun Louvo  Frank Ostholt  on Little Paint
team:   (Ingrid Klimke, Michael Jung, Sandra Auffarth, Andreas Dibowski)   (Donatien Schauly, Nicolas Touzaint, Stanislas de Zuchowicz, Pascal Leroy)   (Mary King, Piggy French, William Fox-Pitt, Nicola Wilson)
2011 CHIO Rotterdam in Rotterdam, Netherlands (CSIO 5*):
Show jumping Grand Prix:  Beezie Madden  on Coral Reef Via Volo  Jeroen Dubbeldam  on Simon  Carsten-Otto Nagel  on Corradina

Field hockey
Men's EuroHockey Nations Championship in Mönchengladbach, Germany:
Bronze medal match:  1–2 (a.e.t.)  
Final:   2–4  
Germany win the title for the seventh time.

Football (soccer)
CAF Champions League Group stage Matchday 4:
Group A: Coton Sport  2–0  Al-Hilal
Standings (after 4 matches):  Enyimba 8 points, Al-Hilal 7, Coton Sport 4,  Raja Casablanca 2.
Group B: MC Alger  0–0  Al-Ahly
Standings (after 4 matches):  Espérance ST,  Wydad Casablanca 6 points, Al-Ahly 5, MC Alger 2.
CAF Confederation Cup Group stage Matchday 4:
Group A:
Kaduna United  2–1  ASEC Mimosas
Inter Luanda  2–1  Club Africain
Standings (after 4 matches): Inter Luanda 7 points, Club Africain, Kaduna United 5, ASEC Mimosas 4.

Golf
European Tour:
Johnnie Walker Championship at Gleneagles in Auchterarder, Perth and Kinross, Scotland:
Winner: Thomas Bjørn  277 (−11)PO
Bjørn wins a five-way playoff for his second European Tour title of the season and 12th of his career.
LPGA Tour:
CN Canadian Women's Open in Mirabel, Quebec:
Winner: Brittany Lincicome  275 (−13)
Lincicome wins her second LPGA Tour title of the season and fifth of her career.
Champions Tour:
Boeing Classic in Snoqualmie, Washington:
Winner: Mark Calcavecchia  202 (−14)PO
Calcavecchia defeats fellow American Russ Cochran in a playoff for his first Champions Tour title.
Amateur events:
U.S. Amateur in Erin, Wisconsin:
Final: Kelly Kraft  def. Patrick Cantlay  2 up

Judo
World Championships in Paris, France:
Men's team:       & 
Women's team:       &

Motorcycle racing
Moto GP:
Indianapolis Grand Prix in Indianapolis, United States (ESP unless stated):
MotoGP: (1) Casey Stoner  (Honda) (2) Dani Pedrosa (Honda) (3) Ben Spies  (Yamaha)
Riders' championship standings (after 12 of 18 races): (1) Stoner 243 points (2) Jorge Lorenzo (Yamaha) 199 (3) Andrea Dovizioso  (Honda) 174
Moto2: (1) Marc Márquez (Suter) (2) Pol Espargaró (FTR) (3) Esteve Rabat (FTR)
Riders' championship standings (after 11 of 17 races): (1) Stefan Bradl  (Kalex) 193 points (2) Márquez 165 (3) Andrea Iannone  (Suter) & Alex de Angelis  (Motobi) 96
125cc: (1) Nicolás Terol (Aprilia) (2) Maverick Viñales (Aprilia) (3) Sandro Cortese  (Aprilia)
Riders' championship standings (after 11 of 17 races): (1) Terol 191 points (2) Johann Zarco  (Derbi) 165 (3) Viñales 152

Snooker
Players Tour Championship – Event 4: Paul Hunter Classic in Fürth, Germany:
Final: Mark Davis  0–4 Mark Selby 
Selby wins his sixth professional title.
Order of Merit (after 4 of 12 events): (1) Ronnie O'Sullivan  14,200 (2) Selby 12,200 (3) Judd Trump  11,200

Volleyball
FIVB World Grand Prix Final Round in Macau, China:
Bronze medal match:  0–3  
Final:   0–3  
The United States win the title for the second successive time and fourth time overall.
FIVB Boys Youth World Championship in Bahía Blanca, Argentina:
Bronze medal match:   3–0 
Final:   2–3  
Serbia win the title for the second successive time.

August 27, 2011 (Saturday)

Athletics
World Championships in Daegu, South Korea (KEN unless stated):
Women's Marathon:  Edna Kiplagat 2:28:43  Priscah Jeptoo 2:29:00  Sharon Cherop 2:29:14
Women's 10,000 metres:  Vivian Cheruiyot 30:48.98  Sally Kipyego 30:50.04  Linet Masai 30:53.59
Cheruiyot wins her second world championship title.
Men's decathlon (standings after 5 events): (1) Ashton Eaton   4446 points (2) Trey Hardee  4393 (3) Oleksiy Kasyanov  4310

Auto racing
Sprint Cup Series:
Irwin Tools Night Race in Bristol, Tennessee: (1)  Brad Keselowski (Dodge; Penske Racing) (2)  Martin Truex Jr. (Toyota; Michael Waltrip Racing) (3)  Jeff Gordon (Chevrolet; Hendrick Motorsports)
Drivers' championship standings (after 24 of 36 races): (1)  Kyle Busch (Toyota; Joe Gibbs Racing) 830 points (4 wins) (2)  Jimmie Johnson (Chevrolet; Hendrick Motorsports) 830 (1 win) (3)  Matt Kenseth (Ford; Roush Fenway Racing) 798

Basketball
FIBA Africa Championship in Antananarivo, Madagascar:
Semifinals:
 57–60 
 68–76 
FIBA Asia Championship for Women in Ōmura, Japan:
Semifinals:
 76–62 
 72–66

Cricket
 Friends Life t20 Final in Birmingham: Leicestershire Foxes 145/6 (20 overs); Somerset 127/9 (20 overs). Leicestershire win by 18 runs.

Cycling
Grand Tours:
Vuelta a España, Stage 8:  Joaquim Rodríguez  4h 49' 01"  Michele Scarponi  + 9"  Bauke Mollema  + 9"
General classification (after stage 8): (1) Rodríguez  32h 18' 16" (2) Daniel Moreno   + 32" (3) Jakob Fuglsang  + 34"
UCI Women's Road World Cup:
GP de Plouay in Plouay, France:  Annemiek van Vleuten  3h 12' 28"  Evelyn Stevens  + 3"  Marianne Vos  + 46"
Final standings: (1) van Vleuten 362 points (2) Vos 315 (3) Emma Johansson  (Hitec Products–UCK) 223

Field hockey
Women's EuroHockey Nations Championship in Mönchengladbach, Germany:
Bronze medal match:   2–1 
Final:   3–0  
The Netherlands win the title for the eighth time.

Football (soccer)
2012 CAF Women's Pre-Olympic Tournament Final Round first leg:
 3–0 
 2–1 
CAF Champions League Group stage Matchday 4:
Group B: Espérance ST  0–0  Wydad Casablanca
Standings: Espérance ST, Wydad Casablanca 6 points (4 matches),  Al-Ahly 4 (3),  MC Alger 1 (3).
CAF Confederation Cup Group stage Matchday 4:
Group B:
Motema Pembe  2–0  JS Kabylie
Sunshine Stars  1–1  Maghreb de Fès
Standings (after 4 matches): Maghreb de Fès 8 points, Motema Pembe, Sunshine Stars 7, JS Kabylie 0.
 Women's Professional Soccer Playoffs:
WPS Championship in Rochester, New York: Western New York Flash 1–1 (5–4 pen.) Philadelphia Independence

Golf
PGA Tour:
FedEx Cup Playoffs: The Barclays in Edison, New Jersey:
Winner: Dustin Johnson  194 (−19)
Johnson wins his fifth PGA Tour title.
FedEx Cup points (all USA): (1) Johnson 3691 points (2) Matt Kuchar 2907 (3) Nick Watney 2256

Judo
World Championships in Paris, France:
Men's 100 kg:  Tagir Khaybulaev   Maxim Rakov   Lukas Krpalek  & Irakli Tsirekidze 
Men's +100 kg:  Teddy Riner   Andreas Tölzer   Kim Sung-min  & Aleksandr Mikhailine 
Riner wins his fifth world championship title.
Women's +78 kg:  Tong Wen   Qin Qian   Elena Ivashchenko  & Mika Sugimoto 
Tong wins her fifth world championship title.

Mixed martial arts
UFC 134 in Rio de Janeiro, Brazil:
Middleweight Championship: Anderson Silva  (c) def. Yushin Okami  via TKO (punches)
Light Heavyweight bout: Maurício Rua  def. Forrest Griffin  via KO (punches)
Heavyweight bout: Antônio Rodrigo Nogueira  def. Brendan Schaub  via KO (punches)
Lightweight bout: Edson Barboza  def. Ross Pearson  via split decision (29–28, 28–29, 29–28)
Light Heavyweight bout: Stanislav Nedkov  def. Luiz Cane  via TKO (punches)

Rugby league
Challenge Cup Final in London: Leeds Rhinos 18–28 Wigan Warriors
Wigan win the Cup for the first time since 2002, and 18th time overall.

Rugby union
Tri Nations Series:
Match 6:  25–20 
Final standings: Australia 13 points, New Zealand 10,  5.
Australia win the Tri Nations for the first time since 2001, and third time overall.
Mid-year Tests, Week 8:  9–20

Tennis
ATP World Tour:
Winston-Salem Open in Winston-Salem, United States:
Final: John Isner  def. Julien Benneteau  4–6, 6–3, 6–4
Isner wins his second title of the year and third of his career.
WTA Tour:
New Haven Open at Yale in New Haven, United States:
Final: Caroline Wozniacki  def. Petra Cetkovská  6–4, 6–1
Wozniacki wins her sixth title of the year and 18th of her career, and her fourth consecutive win at the event, matching the feat Venus Williams had also done at New Haven.
Texas Tennis Open in Dallas, United States:
Final: Sabine Lisicki  def. Aravane Rezaï  6–2, 6–1
Lisicki wins her second title of the year and third of her career.

Volleyball
FIVB World Grand Prix Final Round in Macau, China:
Semifinals:
 3–0 
 0–3

August 26, 2011 (Friday)

Auto racing
Nationwide Series:
Food City 250 in Bristol, Tennessee: (1)  Kyle Busch (Toyota; Joe Gibbs Racing) (2)  Joey Logano (Toyota; Joe Gibbs Racing) (3)  Clint Bowyer (Chevrolet; Kevin Harvick Incorporated)
Busch wins his 50th race in the secondary class, surpassing Mark Martin's record of 49 victories.
Drivers' championship standings (after 25 of 34 races): (1)  Ricky Stenhouse Jr. (Ford; Roush Fenway Racing) 867 points (2)  Elliott Sadler (Chevrolet; Kevin Harvick Incorporated) 862 (3)  Reed Sorenson (Chevrolet; Turner Motorsports) 857

Cycling
Grand Tours:
Vuelta a España, Stage 7:  Marcel Kittel  4h 47' 59"  Peter Sagan  s.t.  Óscar Freire  s.t.
General classification (after stage 7): (1) Sylvain Chavanel   27h 29' 12" (2) Daniel Moreno   + 15" (3) Vincenzo Nibali  + 16"

Equestrianism
2011 CHIO Rotterdam in Rotterdam, Netherlands (CSIO 5*):
Show jumping – Nations Cup:   (Marco Kutscher, Thomas Voß, Carsten-Otto Nagel, Marcus Ehning)   (Michael Whitaker, Guy Williams, Ben Maher, John Whitaker)   (Pénélope Leprevost, Kevin Staut, Olivier Guillon, Michel Robert)
FEI Nations Cup standings (final after 8 competitions): (1) Germany 50 point (2)  48.5 (3) Great Britain 47, relegated: ,

Field hockey
Men's EuroHockey Nations Championship in Mönchengladbach, Germany:
Semifinals:
 2–4 
 3–0

Football (soccer)
UEFA Super Cup in Monaco: Barcelona  2–0  Porto
Barcelona win the title for the fourth time.
CAF Champions League Group stage Matchday 4:
Group A: Raja Casablanca  0–0  Enyimba
Standings: Enyimba 8 points (4 matches),  Al-Hilal 7 (3), Raja Casablanca 2 (4),  Coton Sport 1 (3).

Judo
World Championships in Paris, France (JPN unless stated):
Men's 90 kg:  Ilias Iliadis   Daiki Nishiyama  Asley González  & Takashi Ono
Iliadis wins the title for the second successive time.
Women's 70 kg:  Lucie Décosse   Edith Bosch   Yoriko Kunihara & Anett Mészáros 
Décosse wins the title for the second successive time and third time overall.
Women's 78 kg:  Audrey Tcheuméo   Akari Ogata  Mayra Aguiar  & Kayla Harrison

Snooker
Ronnie O'Sullivan compiles the 11th official maximum break of his career during his sixth round match at the Paul Hunter Classic.

Volleyball
FIVB World Grand Prix Final Round in Macau, China (teams in bold advance to the semifinals):
Pool A:
 3–0 
 0–3 
Final standings: Serbia 8 points, Russia 6, Thailand 3, China 1.
Pool B:
 0–3 
 3–1 
Final standings: Brazil 9 points, United States 5, Japan 3, Italy 1.

August 25, 2011 (Thursday)

Basketball
FIBA Africa Championship in Antananarivo, Madagascar:
Quarterfinals:
 94–86 
 59–75 
 86–67 
 83–84 (OT) 
FIBA Asia Championship for Women Level I in Ōmura, Japan (teams in bold advance to semifinals):
 52–71 
 69–67 
 76–53 
Final standings: Korea 10 points, China 9, Japan 8, Chinese Taipei 7, Lebanon 6, India 5.

Cricket
England in Ireland:
Only ODI in Dublin:  201/8 (42/42 overs);  117/8 (23/23 overs). England win by 11 runs (D/L).

Cycling
Grand Tours:
Vuelta a España, Stage 6:  Peter Sagan  4h 38' 22"  Pablo Lastras  s.t.  Valerio Agnoli  s.t.
General classification (after stage 6): (1) Sylvain Chavanel   22h 41' 13" (2) Daniel Moreno   + 15" (3) Vincenzo Nibali  + 16"

Field hockey
Women's EuroHockey Nations Championship in Mönchengladbach, Germany:
Semifinals: (winners qualify for 2012 Summer Olympics)
 2–0 
 1–2

Football (soccer)
UEFA Women's Euro 2013 qualifying Group 5:  2–1 
UEFA Europa League Play-off round second leg (first leg scores in parentheses):
Dinamo București  2–3 (1–2)  Vorskla Poltava. Vorskla Poltava win 5–3 on aggregate.
Spartak Moscow  2–3 (2–2)  Legia Warsaw. Legia Warsaw win 5–4 on aggregate.
Rennes  4–0 (2–1)  Red Star Belgrade. Rennes win 6–1 on aggregate.
PSV Eindhoven  5–0 (0–0)  Ried. PSV Eindhoven win 5–0 on aggregate.
AEK Larnaca  2–1 (0–0)  Rosenborg. AEK Larnaca win 2–1 on aggregate.
Spartak Trnava  1–1 (0–2)  Lokomotiv Moscow. Lokomotiv Moscow win 3–1 on aggregate.
Dynamo Kyiv  1–0 (2–1)  Litex Lovech. Dynamo Kyiv win 3–1 on aggregate.
Gaz Metan Mediaș  1–0 (1–3)  Austria Wien. Austria Wien win 3–2 on aggregate.
Dinamo Tbilisi  1–1 (a.e.t.) (0–1)  AEK Athens. AEK Athens win 2–1 on aggregate.
Hapoel Tel Aviv  4–0 (0–1)  Ekranas. Hapoel Tel Aviv win 4–1 on aggregate.
CSKA Sofia  1–1 (0–2)  Steaua București. Steaua București win 3–1 on aggregate.
Young Boys  2–2 (0–0)  Braga. 2–2 on aggregate; Braga win on away goals.
Rapid București  1–1 (3–1)  Śląsk Wrocław. Rapid București win 4–2 on aggregate.
Sparta Prague  1–0 (0–2)  Vaslui. Vaslui win 2–1 on aggregate.
Panathinaikos  2–1 (0–3)  Maccabi Tel Aviv. Maccabi Tel Aviv win 4–2 on aggregate.
Helsingborg  1–3 (0–1)  Standard Liège. Standard Liège win 4–1 on aggregate.
Schalke 04  6–1 (0–2)  HJK Helsinki. Schalke 04 win 6–3 on aggregate.
Alania Vladikavkaz  2–0 (0–3)  Beşiktaş. Beşiktaş win 3–2 on aggregate.
Vitória Guimarães  0–4 (0–2)  Atlético Madrid. Atlético Madrid win 6–0 on aggregate.
Partizan  1–2 (a.e.t.) (1–1)  Shamrock Rovers. Shamrock Rovers win 3–2 on aggregate.
Anderlecht  2–2 (2–1)  Bursaspor. Anderlecht win 4–3 on aggregate.
Trabzonspor  walkover (0–0)  Athletic Bilbao. Athletic Bilbao qualify for the group stage after Trabzonspor replace Fenerbahçe in the Champions League.
Rangers  1–1 (1–2)  Maribor. Maribor win 3–2 on aggregate.
Dnipro Dnipropetrovsk  1–0 (0–3)  Fulham. Fulham win 3–1 on aggregate.
Sion  3–1 (0–0)  Celtic. Sion win 3–1 on aggregate.
Club Brugge  2–0 (3–3)  Zestafoni. Club Brugge win 5–3 on aggregate.
Sochaux  0–4 (0–0)  Metalist Kharkiv. Metalist Kharkiv win 4–0 on aggregate.
Roma  1–1 (0–1)  Slovan Bratislava. Slovan Bratislava win 2–1 on aggregate.
Rabotnički  1–3 (0–6)  Lazio. Lazio win 9–1 on aggregate.
Birmingham City  3–0 (0–0)  Nacional. Birmingham City win 3–0 on aggregate.
Stoke City  4–1 (1–0)  Thun. Stoke City win 5–1 on aggregate.
AZ  6–0 (1–2)  Aalesund. AZ win 7–2 on aggregate.
Paris Saint-Germain  2–0 (4–0)  Differdange 03. Paris Saint-Germain win 6–0 on aggregate.
Karpaty Lviv  1–1 (0–2)  PAOK. PAOK win 3–1 on aggregate.
Tottenham Hotspur  0–0 (5–0)  Heart of Midlothian. Tottenham Hotspur win 5–0 on aggregate.
Red Bull Salzburg  1–0 (1–2)  Omonia. 2–2 on aggregate; Red Bull Salzburg win on away goals.
Sevilla  1–1 (1–2)  Hannover 96. Hannover 96 win 3–2 on aggregate.
Sporting CP  2–1 (0–0)  Nordsjælland. Sporting CP win 2–1 on aggregate.
Copa Sudamericana:
First stage, second leg (first leg score in parentheses): Juan Aurich  1–2 (0–2)  La Equidad. La Equidad win 6–0 on points.
Second stage, second leg (first leg score in parentheses): Palmeiras  3–1 (0–2)  Vasco da Gama. 3–3 on points, 3–3 on aggregate; Vasco da Gama win on away goals.
CONCACAF Champions League Group Stage Matchday 2:
Group A:
Los Angeles Galaxy  2–0  Alajuelense
Morelia  4–0  Motagua
Standings (after 2 matches): Los Angeles Galaxy 6 points, Morelia, Alajuelense 3, Motagua 0.
Group C:
Toronto FC  0–1  FC Dallas
Tauro  0–0  UNAM
Standings (after 2 matches): FC Dallas 6 points, Toronto FC 3, Tauro, UNAM 1.

Judo
World Championships in Paris, France:
Men's 81 kg:  Kim Jae-bum   Srđan Mrvaljević   Leandro Guilheiro  & Sergiu Toma 
Kim wins the title for the second successive time.
Women's 63 kg:  Gévrise Émane   Yoshie Ueno   Anicka van Emden  & Urška Žolnir

Volleyball
FIVB World Grand Prix Final Round in Macau, China (teams in bold advance to the semifinals):
Pool A:
 1–3 
 1–3 
Standings (after 2 matches): Serbia 5 points, Russia, Thailand 3, China 1.
Pool B:
 3–2 
 3–0 
Standings (after 2 matches): Brazil 6 points, United States 5, Italy 1, Japan 0.

August 24, 2011 (Wednesday)

Basketball
FIBA Africa Championship in Antananarivo, Madagascar:
Round of 16:
 80–72 
 94–50 
 92–75 
 80–59 
FIBA Asia Championship for Women Level I in Ōmura, Japan (teams in bold advance to semifinals):
 75–104 
 63–72 
 79–51 
Standings (after 4 games): Korea 8 points, Japan, China 7, Chinese Taipei 6, Lebanon, India 4.

Cycling
Grand Tours:
Vuelta a España, Stage 5:  Joaquim Rodríguez  4h 42' 54"  Wout Poels  + 4"  Daniel Moreno   + 5"
General classification (after stage 5): (1) Sylvain Chavanel   18h 02' 34" (2) Moreno  + 9" (3) Rodríguez + 23"

Field hockey
Men's EuroHockey Nations Championship in Mönchengladbach, Germany (teams in bold advance to semifinals; teams in italics qualify for 2012 Summer Olympics):
Pool A:
 7–0 
 3–2 
Final standings: Germany 9 points, Belgium 6, Spain 3, Russia 0.
Pool B:
 1–8 
 7–4 
Final standings: Netherlands 9 points, England 6, Ireland 3, France 0.

Football (soccer)
UEFA Champions League Play-off round second leg (first leg scores in parentheses):
Rubin Kazan  1–1 (1–3)  Lyon. Lyon win 4–2 on aggregate.
Viktoria Plzeň  2–1 (3–1)  Copenhagen. Viktoria Plzeň win 5–2 on aggregate.
Sturm Graz  0–2 (1–1)  BATE Borisov. BATE Borisov win 3–1 on aggregate.
Benfica  3–1 (2–2)  Twente. Benfica win 5–3 on aggregate.
Udinese  1–2 (0–1)  Arsenal. Arsenal win 3–1 on aggregate.
Other UEFA Champions League news:
On the eve of the group stage draw,  Fenerbahçe are removed from the Champions League amid allegations that they fixed matches to win last season's Turkish title. Their place in the group stage will be taken up by second-placed  Trabzonspor, who had previously been eliminated from the competition by  Benfica. Trabzonspor's opponent in the Europa League play-off round,  Athletic Bilbao, will receive a direct entry into the group stage of that competition.
Recopa Sudamericana second leg (first leg score in parentheses): Internacional  3–1 (1–2)  Independiente. 3–3 on points; Internacional win 4–3 on aggregate.
Internacional win the Recopa for the second time.
Copa Sudamericana Second stage second leg (first leg scores in parentheses):
São Paulo  3–0 (1–2)  Ceará. 3–3 on points; São Paulo win 4–2 on aggregate.
Atlético Paranaense  0–1 (0–1)  Flamengo. Flamengo win 6–0 on points.
CONCACAF Champions League Group Stage Matchday 2:
Group B: Isidro Metapán  2–0  Santos Laguna
Standings (after 2 matches):  Colorado Rapids 4 points, Isidro Metapán, Santos Laguna 3,  Real España 1.
Group C: Toronto FC  –  FC Dallas – abandoned at halftime due to lightning and heavy rain, to be replayed on August 25.
Group D: Comunicaciones  2–0  Herediano
Standings (after 2 matches):  Seattle Sounders 6 points,  Monterrey, Comunicaciones 3, Herediano 0.

Judo
World Championships in Paris, France (JPN unless stated):
Men's 73 kg:  Riki Nakaya  Dex Elmont   Navruz Jurakobilov  & Ugo Legrand 
Women's 52 kg:  Misato Nakamura  Yuka Nishida  Ana Carrascosa  & Andreea Chitu 
Nakamura wins her second world title.
Women's 57 kg:  Aiko Sato  Rafaela Silva   Corina Caprioriu  & Kaori Matsumoto

Volleyball
FIVB World Grand Prix Final Round in Macau, China:
Pool A:
 1–3 
 2–3 
Pool B:
 0–3 
 3–0 
Women's African Championship in Nairobi, Kenya:
Bronze medal match:  2–3  
Final:   3–1  
Kenya win the title for the seventh time, and qualify for the FIVB World Cup.

August 23, 2011 (Tuesday)

Basketball
FIBA Africa Championship in Antananarivo, Madagascar:
Round of 16:
 84–46 
 85–52 
 71–66 
 82–71 
FIBA Asia Championship for Women Level I in Ōmura, Japan (team in bold advances to semifinals):
 87–38 
 83–55 
 66–59 
Standings (after 3 games): Korea 6 points, China, Japan, Chinese Taipei 5, Lebanon, India 3.

Cycling
Grand Tours:
Vuelta a España, Stage 4:  Daniel Moreno  4h 51' 53"  Chris Anker Sørensen  + 3"  Dan Martin  + 11"
General classification (after stage 4): (1) Sylvain Chavanel   13h 19' 09" (2) Moreno  + 43" (3) Jakob Fuglsang  + 49"

Field hockey
Women's EuroHockey Nations Championship in Mönchengladbach, Germany (teams in bold advance to semifinals):
Pool A:
 1–2 
 5–1 
Final standings: Spain 9 points, Netherlands 6, Azerbaijan 3, Italy 0.
Pool B:
 1–3 
 4–0 
Final standings: England 9 points, Germany 6, Belgium 3, Ireland 0.

Football (soccer)
UEFA Champions League Play-off round second leg (first leg scores in parentheses):
APOEL  3–1 (0–1)  Wisła Kraków. APOEL win 3–2 on aggregate.
Genk  2–1 (1–2) (a.e.t.)  Maccabi Haifa. 3–3 on aggregate, Genk win 4–1 on penalties.
Malmö FF  2–0 (1–4)  Dinamo Zagreb. Dinamo Zagreb win 4–3 on aggregate.
Villarreal  3–0 (0–1)  Odense. Villarreal win 3–1 on aggregate.
Zürich  0–1 (0–2)  Bayern Munich. Bayern Munich win 3–0 on aggregate.
Copa Sudamericana:
First stage, second leg (first leg score in parentheses): Santa Fe  2–0 (1–1)  Universidad César Vallejo. Santa Fe win 4–1 on points.
Second stage, second leg (first leg score in parentheses): Botafogo  1–0 (2–1)  Atlético Mineiro. Botafogo win 6–0 on points.
CONCACAF Champions League Group Stage Matchday 2:
Group B: Real España  1–1  Colorado Rapids
Standings: Colorado Rapids 4 points (2 matches),  Santos Laguna 3 (1), Real España 1 (2),  Isidro Metapán 0 (1).
Group D:
Monterrey  0–1  Seattle Sounders
Comunicaciones  –  Herediano — postponed due to heavy rain
Standings: Seattle Sounders 6 points (2 matches), Monterrey 3 (2), Comunicaciones, Herediano 0 (1).

Judo
World Championships in Paris, France:
Men's 60 kg:  Rishod Sobirov   Hiroaki Hiraoka   Ilgar Mushkiyev  & Georgii Zantaraia 
Sobirov wins the title for the second successive time.
Men's 66 kg:  Masashi Ebinuma   Leandro Cunha   Musa Mogushkov  & Cho Jun-ho 
Women's 48 kg:  Haruna Asami   Tomoko Fukumi   Sarah Menezes  & Éva Csernoviczki 
Asami wins the title for the second successive time.

Multi-sport events
Summer Universiade in Shenzhen, China:
Taekwondo:
Men's −63 kg:  Umut Bildik   Steven Barclais   Chu Yuan-chih  & Alfonso Victoria 
Men's −87 kg:  Park Yong-hyun   Guilherme Felix   Bruak Eski  & Rouhollah Talebi 
Women's −53 kg:  Hatice Kübra Yangın   Laura Urriola   Aziza Chambers  & Ivett Gonda 
Women's −73 kg:  Chuang Chia-chia   Park Mi-yeon   Elena Gómez  & Anne-Caroline Graffe 
Water polo:
Men's tournament:

August 22, 2011 (Monday)

Basketball
FIBA Africa Championship in Antananarivo, Madagascar:
Group B:
 92–54 
 61–75 
Final standings: Senegal 6 points, Angola 5, Morocco 4, Chad 3.
Group D:
 87–67 
 52–65 
Final standings: Tunisia 6 points, Central African Republic 5, Rwanda 4, Togo 3.
FIBA Asia Championship for Women Level I in Ōmura, Japan:
 47–83 
 58–79 
 81–54 
Standings (after 2 games): Japan, Korea 4 points, China, Chinese Taipei 3, Lebanon, India 2.

Cricket
India in England:
4th Test in London, day 5:  591/6d;  300 & 283 (f/o, 91 overs; Graeme Swann 6/106). England win by an innings & 8 runs; win 4-match series 4–0.
Australia in Sri Lanka:
5th ODI in Hambantota:  211 (46.1 overs);  213/6 (47 overs). Sri Lanka win by 4 wickets; Australia win 5-match series 3–2.

Cycling
Grand Tours:
Vuelta a España, Stage 3:  Pablo Lastras  3h 58' 00"  Sylvain Chavanel  + 15"  Markel Irizar  + 15"
General classification (after stage 3): (1) Lastras  8h 25' 59" (2) Chavanel + 20" (3) Irizar + 1' 08"

Field hockey
Men's EuroHockey Nations Championship in Mönchengladbach, Germany (team in bold advances to semifinals):
Pool A:
 7–1 
 1–3 
Standings (after 2 matches): Germany 6 points, Belgium, Spain 3, Russia 0.
Pool B:
 0–2 
 3–4 
Standings (after 2 matches): Netherlands 6 points, England, Ireland 3, France 0.

Multi-sport events
Summer Universiade in Shenzhen, China:
Badminton (TPE unless stated):
Men's singles:  Suppanyu Avihingsanon   Wen Kai   Takuma Ueda  & Hsueh Hsuanyi
Men's doubles:  Maneepong Jongjit/Bodin Isara   Lee Sheng-mu/Fang Chieh-min  Afiat Yuris Wirawan/Rendy Sugiarto  & Wu Chunwei/Liao Menchun
Women's singles:  Cheng Shao-chieh  Pai Hsiao-ma  Liu Fang Hua  & Shi Xiao Qian 
Women's doubles:  Jang Ye-na/Eom Hye-won   Cheng/Pai  Wang Peirong/Hsieh Peichen & Savitree Amitrapai/Nessara Somsri 
Mixed doubles:  Eom Hye-won/Shin Baek-cheol   Lee/Hsieh  Ricky Widianto/Shendy Puspa Irawati  & Jongjit/Amitrapai
Basketball:
Men's tournament:      
Diving:
Men's synchro 10m platform:  Huo Liang/Lin Yue  474.69 points  Victor Minibaev/Ilya Zakharov  453.42  Rommel Pacheco/Jonathan Ruvalcaba  421.50
Men's team:   3718.46 points   3239.83   3239.69
Women's synchro 3m springboard:  He Zi/Wang Han  334.20 points  Olena Fedorova/Hanna Pysmenska  301.50  Bianca Alvarez/Carrie Dragland  292.50
Women's team:   2674.18 points   2373.03   2336.23
Football:
Men's tournament:      
Gymnastics:
Group aerobics:   (Che Lei, Li Liangfa, Liu Chao, Liu Tianbo, Tao Le, Wang Zizhuo) 21.750   (Danil Chayun, Garsevan Dzhanazyan, Valerii Gusev, Alexander Kondratichev, Kirill Lobaznyuk, Igor Trushkov) 21.650   (Andreea Bogati, Laura Andreea Cristache, Petru Porime Tolan, Anca Claudia Surdu, Mircea Zamfir) 21.265
Aerobic teams:   &   
Hoop:  Yevgeniya Kanayeva  29.150  Alina Maksimenko  28.100  Deng Senyue  27.050
Ball:  Kanayeva 29.200  Daria Dmitrieva  28.400  Liubov Charkashyna  28.200
Clubs:  Kanayeva 29.200  Aliya Garayeva  27.725  Maksimenko 27.375
Ribbon:  Dmitrieva 28.600  Kanayeva 28.575  Charkashyna 28.200
3 ribbons + 2 hoops:   (Liu Shu, Ma Qianhui, Wang Xue, Wang Yuting, Wu Mengran, Zou Lie) 27.100   (Alexandra Elyutina, Margarita Goncharova, Yulia Guryanova, Daria Kuvshinova, Anna Loman, Alexandra Makarova) 26.900   (Yurie Akashi, Saori Inagaki, Motoi Kasahara, Yurika Kurimoto, Kaho Okamoto, Kasumi Sakihama) 24.600
5 balls:   (Liu Shu, Ma, Wang Xue, Wang Yuting, Wu, Zou) 26.950   (Elyutina, Goncharova, Guryanova, Kuvshinova, Loman, Makarova) 26.925   (Akashi, Inagaki, Kasahara, Kurimoto, Okamoto, Sakihama) 25.875
Shooting:
Men's 50m rifle 3 positions:  Niccolò Campriani   Kang Hongwei   Sergey Kamenskiy 
Men's 25m standard pistol:  Ding Feng   Zhou Zhiguo   Dmitry Brayko 
Men's team 25m standard pistol:   (Ding, Li Yuehong, Zhou)   (Brayko, Sergei Cherviakovski, Ivan Stukachev)   (Pongpol Kulchairattana, Pruet Sriyaphan, Bhawin Tantinvachai)
Men's double trap:  Alexander Furasyev  193  Pan Qiang  192  Hwang Sun-jin  191
Men's team double trap:   (Pan, Yang Yiyang, Li Jun) 427   (Furasyev, Artur Mingazov, Roman Zagumennov) 423   Antonino Barillà, Alessandro Chianese, Ferdinando Rossi) 420
Women's 50m rifle 3 positions:  Adéla Sýkorová   Narantuya Chuluunbadrakh   Kata Veres 
Women's double trap:  Yang Xiaohui  101  Mariya Dmitriyenko  98+3   Hsu Jie-yu  98+2
Taekwondo:
Men's −74 kg:  Kim Seon-uk   Farzad Zolghadri   Christos Pilavakis  & Fernando Ortega 
Men's +87 kg:  Arsen Tcinaridze   Ali Sari   Balázs Tóth  & Rosbelis Despaigne 
Women's −62 kg:  Noh Eun-sil   Eva Calvo Gómez   Carmen Marton  & Edina Kotsis 
Women's +73 kg:  Zhang Yongtong   Wiam Dislam   Olga Ivanova  & Tuba Abus 
Volleyball:
Men's tournament:      
Water polo:
Women's tournament:

Volleyball
Women's African Championship in Nairobi, Kenya:
Semifinals:
 3–0 
 3–1

August 21, 2011 (Sunday)

Auto racing
Sprint Cup Series:
Pure Michigan 400 in Brooklyn, Michigan: (1)  Kyle Busch (Toyota; Joe Gibbs Racing) (2)  Jimmie Johnson (Chevrolet; Hendrick Motorsports) (3)  Brad Keselowski (Dodge; Penske Racing)
Busch becomes the first driver to clinch a spot in the Chase for the Sprint Cup.
Drivers' championship standings (after 23 of 36 races): (1) Busch 799 points (2) Johnson 789 (3)  Kevin Harvick (Chevrolet; Richard Childress Racing) 760 (3 wins)
V8 Supercars:
Ipswich 300 in Ipswich, Queensland:
Race 18: (1) Craig Lowndes  (Triple Eight Race Engineering; Holden VE Commodore) (2) Tim Slade  (James Rosenberg Racing; Ford FG Falcon) (3) Shane van Gisbergen  (Stone Brothers Racing; Ford FG Falcon)
Drivers' championship standings (after 18 of 28 races): (1) Jamie Whincup  (Triple Eight Race Engineering; Holden VE Commodore) 1895 points (2) Lowndes 1797 (3) Van Gisbergen 1502
World Rally Championship:
Rallye Deutschland in Trier, Germany: (1) Sébastien Ogier /Julien Ingrassia  (Citroën DS3 WRC) (2) Sébastien Loeb /Daniel Elena  (Citroën DS3 WRC) (3) Dani Sordo /Carlos Del Barrio  (Mini John Cooper Works WRC)
Drivers' championship standings (after 9 of 13 rallies): (1) Loeb 192 points (2) Ogier 167 (3) Mikko Hirvonen  (Ford Fiesta RS WRC) 156

Basketball
FIBA Africa Championship in Antananarivo, Madagascar:
Group A:
 72–69 (OT) 
 112–81 
Final standings: Nigeria 6 points, Mali 5, Mozambique 4, Madagascar 3.
Group C:
 68–71 
 76–70 
Final standings: Cameroon 6 points, Côte d'Ivoire, Egypt, South Africa 4.
FIBA Asia Championship for Women Level I in Ōmura, Japan:
 81–53 
 99–93 (2OT) 
 49–77 
FIBA Europe Under-16 Championship for Women in Cagliari, Italy:
Bronze medal game:   82–48 
Final:   43–67  
Spain win the title for the seventh time.
PBA Governors Cup Finals in Quezon City, Philippines:
Game 6: Petron Blaze Boosters 85, Talk 'N Text Tropang Texters 73. Boosters win series 4–3.
Petron win their 19th league title and prevent Talk 'N Text from winning the Grand Slam.

Canoeing
Sprint World Championships in Szeged, Hungary:
Men's Canoe:
C–1 200 m:  Valentin Demyanenko  39.339  Ivan Shtyl  39.573  Alfonso Benavides  39.687
Demyanenko wins the event for the third time.
C–1 5000 m:  Mykhaylo Koshman  23:23.823  Lukáš Koranda  23:24.987  José Luis Bouza  23:55.173
C–2 200 m:  Raimundas Labuckas/Tomas Gadeikis  37.101  Viktor Melantyev/Nikolay Lipkin  37.413  Dzmitry Rabchanka/Aleksandr Vauchetskiy  37.599
Labuckas and Gadeikis win the event for the third successive time.
C–1 4 × 200 m Relay:   (Shtyl, Evgeny Ignatov, Alexey Korovashkov, Melantiev) 2:46.955   (Sergiy Bezugliy, Maksym Prokopenko, Demyanenko, Andriy Kraytor) 2:48.341   (Stefan Holtz, Björn Waeschke, Stefan Kiraj, Sebastian Brendel) 2:48.473
Shtyl and Ignatov both win the event for the third successive time and their sixth world title overall.
Men's Kayak:
K–1 200 m:  Piotr Siemionowski  34.770  Ed McKeever  34.986  Ronald Rauhe  35.118
K–1 5000 m:  Max Hoff  19:51.200  Aleh Yurenia  20:07.952  Maximilian Benassi  20:11.936
Hoff wins his second title of the championships and fourth world title overall.
K–2 200 m:  Arnaud Hybois/Sébastien Jouve  31.940  Jon Schofield/Liam Heath  32.156  Raman Piatrushenka/Vadzim Makhneu  32.390
Hybois and Jouve both win the event for the second time and their third world title overall.
K–1 4 × 200 m Relay:   (Saúl Craviotto Rivero, Ekaitz Saies Sistiaga, Carlos Pérez Rial, Pablo Andrés) 2:24.891   (Viktor Zavolskiy, Alexander Dyachenko, Mikhail Tamonov, Yevgeny Salakhov) 2:25.701   (Casper Nielsen, Jimmy Bøjesen, Kasper Bleibach, Lasse Nielsen) 2:25.821
Pérez wins the event for the third successive time and his fourth world title overall.
Andres wins the event for the second time.
Women's canoe:
C–1 200 m:  Laurence Vincent-Lapointe  39.339  Maria Kazakova  39.339  Staniliya Stamenova  39.339
Vincent-Lapointe wins her second title of the championships, her second title in this event and third world title overall.
Women's Kayak:
K–1 200 m:  Lisa Carrington  39.998  Marta Walczykiewicz  40.472  Inna Osypenko-Radomska  40.670
K–1 5000 m:  Tamara Csipes  22:19.816  Lani Belcher  22:26.572  Maryna Paltaran  22:37.294
Csipes wins her second title of the championships and fourth world title overall.
K–2 200 m:  Katalin Kovács/Danuta Kozák  37.667  Karolina Naja/Magdalena Krukowska  38.165  Joanne Brigden-Jones/Hannah Davis  38.369
Kovács wins her second title of the championships, her fifth title in this event and extends her record to 31 titles and 40 medals overall.
Kozák wins her second title of the championships and fifth world title overall.
K–1 4 × 200 m Relay:   (Nicole Reinhardt, Conny Waßmuth, Tina Dietze, Carolin Leonhardt) 2:49.541   (Natalia Lobova, Anastasiya Sergeeva, Natalia Proskurina, Svetlana Kudinova) 2:50.207   (Walczykiewicz, Naja, Aneta Konieczna, Ewelina Wojnarowska) 2:50.951
Reinhardt wins her second title of the championships, her third title in this event and eighth world title overall.
Waßmuth wins her third title in this event and seventh world title overall.
Dietze wins her second title in this event and third world title overall.
Leonhardt wins her sixth world title.

Cricket
India in England:
4th Test in London, day 4:  591/6d;  300 (94 overs; Rahul Dravid 146*) & 129/3 (f/o, 35 overs). India trail by 162 runs with 7 wickets remaining.
Bangladesh in Zimbabwe:
5th ODI in Bulawayo:  253/6 (50 overs);  160 (38.2 overs). Bangladesh win by 93 runs; Zimbabwe win 5-match series 3–2.

Cycling
Grand Tours:
Vuelta a España, Stage 2:  Christopher Sutton  4h 11' 41"  Vicente Reynés  s.t.  Marcel Kittel  s.t.
General classification (after stage 2): (1) Daniele Bennati   4h 28' 11" (2) Jakob Fuglsang  + 0" (3) Maxime Monfort  + 0"
UCI World Tour:
Vattenfall Cyclassics:  Edvald Boasson Hagen  4h 49' 40"  Gerald Ciolek  s.t.  Borut Božič  s.t.
UCI World Tour standings (after 21 of 27 races): (1) Cadel Evans  574 points (2) Philippe Gilbert  568 (3) Alberto Contador  471
UCI Mountain Bike World Cup Final in Val di Sole, Italy:
Men's cross-country:  Jaroslav Kulhavý   Nino Schurter   Florian Vogel 
Final Standings: (1) Kulhavy (2) Schurter (3) Julien Absalon 
Women's cross-country:  Catharine Pendrel   Maja Włoszczowska   Gunn-Rita Dahle Flesjå 
Final Standings: (1) Julie Bresset  (2) Pendrel (3) Irina Kalentieva 
Men's downhill:  Aaron Gwin  3:10.356  Danny Hart  3:11.588  Gee Atherton  3:14.470
Final standings: (1) Gwin 1558 points (2) Greg Minnaar  1093 (3) Atherton 1009
Women's downhill:  Myriam Nicole  3:52.231  Floriane Pugin  3:53.040  Rachel Atherton  3:54.405
Final standings: (1) Tracy Moseley  1465 points (2) Pugin 1390 (3) Atherton 1115
Men's four-cross:  Tomáš Slavík   Johannes Fischbach   Kamil Tatarkovič 
Final standings: (1) Jared Graves  1620 points (2) Slavík 1174 (3) Michal Prokop  1030
Women's four-cross:  Anneke Beerten   Lucia Oetjen   Melissa Buhl 
Final standings: (1) Beerten 1400 points (2) Oetjen 1010 (3) Fionn Griffiths  780

Equestrianism
European Dressage Championship in Rotterdam, Netherlands:
Grand Prix Freestyle:  Adelinde Cornelissen  on Parzival  Carl Hester  on Uthopia  Patrik Kittel  on Scandic

Field hockey
Men's EuroHockey Nations Championship in Mönchengladbach, Germany:
Pool B:
 4–2 
 8–1 
Women's EuroHockey Nations Championship in Mönchengladbach, Germany:
Pool A:
 5–3 
 1–0 
Standings (after 2 matches): Spain 6 points, Netherlands, Azerbaijan 3, Italy 0.
Pool B: (team in bold advances to the semifinals)
 2–0 
 0–3 
Standings (after 2 matches): England 6 points, Germany, Belgium 3, Ireland 0.

Golf
Senior majors:
Constellation Energy Senior Players Championship in Harrison, New York:
Leaderboard after final round: (T1) Fred Couples  & John Cook  273 (−11) (3) Peter Senior  274 (−10)
Couples defeats Cook on the third playoff hole to win his first senior major and fifth career Champions Tour title.
PGA Tour:
Wyndham Championship in Greensboro, North Carolina:
Winner: Webb Simpson  262 (−18)
Simpson wins his first PGA Tour title.
European Tour:
Czech Open in Čeladná, Czech Republic:
Winner: Oliver Fisher  275 (−13)
Fisher wins his first European Tour title.
LPGA Tour:
Safeway Classic in North Plains, Oregon:
Winner: Suzann Pettersen  207 (−6)PO
Pettersen defeats Choi Na-yeon  on the first playoff hole to win her eighth LPGA Tour title.

Multi-sport events
Summer Universiade in Shenzhen, China:
Athletics:
Men's 800m:  Lachlan Renshaw  1:46.36  Teng Haining  1:46.62  Fred Samoei  1:46.72
Men's 5000m:  Andy Vernon  14:00.06  Evgeny Rybakov  14:00.60  Stefano La Rosa  14:02.95
Men's 4 × 100 m relay:   (Johannes Dreyer, Simon Magakwe, Rapula Sefanyetso, Thuso Mpuang) 39.25   (Yang Yang, Huang Minhua, Chang Pengben, Zheng Dongsheng) 39.39   (Yip Siukeung, Lai Chun Ho, Leung Kiho, Ho Manloklawrence) 39.44
Men's 4 × 400 m relay:   (Aleksandr Sigalovskiy, Dmitry Buryak, Artem Vazhov, Valentin Kruglyakov) 3:04.51   (Hiroyuki Nakano, Shintaro Horie, Hideyuki Hirose, Takatoshi Abe) 3:05.16   (Shane Victor, Andre Olivier, Pieter Beneke, Willem de Beer) 3:05.61
Men's long jump:  Su Xiongfeng  8.17m  Marquise Goodwin  8.03m  Julian Reid  7.96m
Men's discus throw:  Märt Israel  64.07m  Przemyslaw Czajkowski  63.62m  Ronald Julião  63.30m
Men's half marathon:  Ahmed Tamri  1:06:20  Fatih Bilgic  1:06:20  Tsubasa Hayakawa  1:06:25
Men's team half marathon:   (Hayakawa, Hiromitsu Kakuage, Takehiro Deki) 3:20:37   (Bian Qi, Zheng Guojun, Yan Jun) 3:37:25
Women's 1500m:  Aslı Çakır Alptekin  4:05.56  Anna Mishchenko  4:05.91  Ekaterina Gorbunova  4:06.16
Women's 4 × 100 m relay:   (Hanna Titimets, Nataliya Pohrebnyak, Khrystyna Stuy, Yelizaveta Bryzhina) 43.33   (Lakya Brookins, Shayla Mahan, Christina Manning, Tiffany Townsend) 43.48   (Shermaine Williams, Carrie Russell, Anneisha McLaughlin, Anastasia Le-Roy) 43.57
Women's 4 × 400 m relay:   (Marina Karnaushchenko, Yelena Migunova, Kseniya Ustalova, Olga Topilskaya) 3:27.16  (Nagihan Karadere, Merve Aydın, Meliz Redif, Pınar Saka) 3:30.14   (Kelly Massey, Charlotte Best, Meghan Beesley, Emily Diamond) 3:33.09
Women's high jump:  Brigetta Barrett  1.96m  Airinė Palšytė  1.96m  Anna Iljuštšenko  1.94m
Women's half marathon:  Ro Un-Ok  1:16:38  Jin Lingling  1:16:42  Sayo Nomura  1:16:48
Women's team half marathon:   (Nomura, Machiko Iwakawa, Aki Otagiri) 3:50:43   (Jin, Jiang Xiaoli, Li Zhenzhu) 3:53:09
Basketball:
Women's tournament:      
Chess (CHN unless stated):
Men's individual:  Li Chao  Wang Hao  Wang Yue
Women's individual:  Tan Zhongyi  Batkhuyagiin Möngöntuul   Huang Qian
Mixed team:      
Diving:
Men's 10m platform:  Wu Jun  537.00 points  Victor Minibaev  528.75  Rommel Pacheco  492.05
Football:
Women's tournament:      
Gymnastics:
Aerobic step:   (Huang Jinxuan, Lin Junxian, Qiao Dayan, Shou Minchao, Wang Yang, Xu Fan, Zhao Sitong, Zheng Ziya, Zou Qin) 17.750   (Polina Amosenok, Danil Chayun, Maxim Grinin, Olga Kislukhina, Veronika Korneva, Anzhella Korotkova, Evgeniya Kudymova, Kirill Lobaznyuk, Dmitrii Safonov, Denis Shurupov) 17.600   (Choe Ha-neul, Jo Ye-ran, Kim Ji-un, Lee Sa-lang, Shim Mi-hyun, Shin Hyun-kyung) 17.520
Trios:   (Kim Guon-taeck, Lee Kyung-ho, Ryu Ju-sun) 21.400   (Alexander Kondratichev, Lobaznyuk, Igor Trushkov) 21.100   (Valentin Mavrodineanu, Tolan Petru Porime, Mircea Zamfir) 20.950
All-around individual:  Yevgeniya Kanayeva  115.350   Daria Dmitrieva  111.875  Liubov Charkashyna  109.700
All-around team:   (Liu Shu, Ma Qianhui, Wang Xue, Wang Yuting, Wu Mengran, Zou Lie) 52.750   (Alexandra Elyutina, Margarita Goncharova, Yulia Guryanova, Daria Kuvshinova, Anna Loman, Alexandra Makarova) 51.525   (Yurie Akashi, Saori Inagaki, Motoi Kasahara, Yurika Kurimoto, Kaho Okamoto, Kasumi Sakihama) 49.750
Sailing:
Men's laser standard:  Daniel Mihelic   Malte Kamrath   Sergey Komissarov 
Men's RS:X:  Fang Zhennan   Lukasz Grodzicki   Lee Tae-hoon 
470 Open:  Vladimir Chaus/Denis Gribanov   Fábio Silva/Gustavo Thiesen   Erika Tokushige/Jumpei Hokazono 
Women's laser radial:  Zhang Dongshuang   Victoria Jing Hua Chan   Yevgeniya Kuznetsova 
Women's RS:X:  Chen Peina   Megumi Komine   Malgorzata Bialecka 
Country classification:   (Chen Zhiwei, Fang, Xie Lidiao, Zhang)   (Chaus, Liudmila Dmitrieva, Gribanov, Alisa Kirilyuk, Kuznetsova)   (Hokazono, Megumi Iseda, Megumi Komine, Jun Ogawa, Tokushige)
Shooting:
Men's skeet:  Giancarlo Tazza  147+2  Ralf Buchheim  147+1  Gorden Gosch  143
Men's team skeet:   (Daniel Herberger, Petr Málek, Jakub Novota) 353   (Alexander Bondar, Nikolay Pilshchikov, Nikolay Teplyy) 350   (Anastasios Chapesiis, Andreas Chasikos, Dimitris Konstantinou) 344
Men's team 50m rifle 3 positions:   (Cao Yifei, Kang Hongwei, Gong Jiawei) 3503+166   (Jeremy Monnier, Etienne Germond, Remi Moreno Flores) 3490+151   (Sergey Kamenskiy, Vladimir Tugushev, Nazar Luginets) 3481+155
Women's 25m pistol:  Tanyaporn Prucksakorn   Zorana Arunović   Olena Kostevych 
Women's team 25m pistol:   (Kostevych, Inna Kryachko, Kateryna Domkina) 1728+47   (Lee Ho-lim, Jo Soo-young, Kim Ji-hye) 1721+44   (Lu Miaoyi, Zhang Shasha, Zhao Xu) 1717+48
Taekwondo:
Men's −58 kg:  Safwan Khalil   Hadi Mostean   Serkan Tok  & Andrei Rotaru 
Men's −80 kg:  Mehran Askari   Yunus Sarı   Avet Osmanov  & Issam Chernoubi 
Women's −49 kg:  Alexandra Lychagina   Kim Jae-ah   Hung Shih-han  & Maeva Coutant 
Women's −67 kg:  Guo Yunfei   Furkan Asena Aydın   Woo Seu-mi  Seham Sawalhy 
Tennis:
Men's singles:  Lim Yong-kyu   Teymuraz Gabashvili   Siarhei Betau  & Aliaksander Bury 
Men's team:   (Lim, Oh Dae-soung, Seol Jae-min)   (Betau, Bury)   (Hsieh Cheng-peng, Huang Liang-chi, Lee Hsin-han)
Women's singles:  Nudnida Luangnam   Nungnadda Wannasuk   Ksenia Lykina  & Yoo Mi 
Women's team:   (Luangnam, Wannasuk, Varatchaya Wongteanchai)   (Shuko Aoyama, Sachie Ishizu, Hiroko Kuwata, Kotomi Takahata)   (Lykina, Marta Sirotkina)
Mixed doubles:  Chan Chin-wei/Lee   Bury/Sviatlana Pirazhenka   Aoyama/Takuto Niki  & Weerapat Doakmaiklee/Wongteanchai 
Volleyball:
Women's tournament:

Rugby union
Mid-year Tests, Week 7:  20–14

Snooker
Players Tour Championship – Event 3 in Sheffield, England:
Final: Ben Woollaston  4–2 Graeme Dott 
Woollaston wins his first professional title.
Order of Merit (after 3 of 12 events): (1) Ronnie O'Sullivan  11,700 (2) Judd Trump 10,600 (3) Woollaston 10,200

Tennis
ATP World Tour:
Western & Southern Open in Cincinnati, United States:
Final: Andy Murray  def. Novak Djokovic  6–4, 3–0 retired
Murray wins his second title of the year, and his seventh Masters 1000 title and 18th title of his career.
Djokovic suffers only his second defeat of the year.
WTA Tour:
Western & Southern Open in Cincinnati, United States:
Final: Maria Sharapova  def. Jelena Janković  4–6, 7–6(3), 6–3
Sharapova wins her second title of the year and 24th of her career.

Volleyball
FIVB World Grand Prix Third Round: (teams in bold advance to the final round)
Pool I in Hong Kong:
 3–2 
 3–0 
Pool J in Hong Kong:
 3–0 
 0–3 
Pool K in Bangkok, Thailand:
 0–3 
 3–0 
Pool L in Tokyo, Japan:
 3–0 
 3–0 
Final standings: Brazil 27 points, United States 23, Russia 21, Serbia 20, Italy 19, Japan 18, China 17, Thailand 15, South Korea, Poland 13, Cuba 9, Dominican Republic 8, Germany 7, Argentina 4, Kazakhstan 2, Peru 0.
Women's African Championship in Nairobi, Kenya: (teams in bold advance to the semifinals)
Group A:
 3–0 
 1–3 
Final standings: Kenya 6 points, Egypt 5, Cameroon 4, Nigeria 3.
Group B:
 2–3 
 0–3 
Final standings: Algeria 8 points, Senegal 7, Tunisia 6,  5, Rwanda 4.
FIVB Girls Youth World Championship in Ankara, Turkey:
3rd place match:   3–0 
Final:   3–0  
Turkey win the title for the first time.

August 20, 2011 (Saturday)

Auto racing
Nationwide Series:
NAPA Auto Parts 200 in Montreal: (1)  Marcos Ambrose (Ford; Richard Petty Motorsports) (2)  Alex Tagliani (Dodge; Penske Racing) (3)  Michael McDowell (Toyota; Joe Gibbs Racing)
Drivers' championship standings (after 24 of 34 races): (1)  Ricky Stenhouse Jr. (Ford; Roush Fenway Racing) 834 points (2)  Elliott Sadler (Chevrolet; Kevin Harvick Incorporated) 826 (3)  Reed Sorenson (Chevrolet; Turner Motorsports) 825
V8 Supercars:
Ipswich 300 in Ipswich, Queensland:
Race 16: (1) Craig Lowndes  (Triple Eight Race Engineering; Holden VE Commodore) (2) Tim Slade  (James Rosenberg Racing; Ford FG Falcon) (3) Jamie Whincup  (Triple Eight Race Engineering; Holden VE Commodore)
Race 17: (1) Lowndes (2) Whincup (3) Slade
Drivers' championship standings (after 17 of 28 races): (1) Whincup 1817 points (2) Lowndes 1647 (3) Shane van Gisbergen  (Stone Brothers Racing; Ford FG Falcon) 1398

Basketball
FIBA Africa Championship in Antananarivo, Madagascar:
Group B:
 57–89 
 78–85 
Standings (after 2 games): Senegal 4 points, Angola, Morocco 3, Chad 2.
Group D:
 57–82 
 69–37 
Standings (after 2 games): Tunisia, Central African Republic 4 points, Rwanda, Togo 2.

Canoeing
Sprint World Championships in Szeged, Hungary:
Men's Canoe:
C–1 500 m:  Vladimir Fedosenko  1:46.647  Dzianis Harazha  1:46.827  Oleksandr Maksymchuk  1:47.679
C–2 1000 m:   (Stefan Holtz, Tomasz Wylenzek) 2:42.643   (Sergiy Bezugliy, Maksym Prokopenko) 2:43.525   (Alexandru Dumitrescu, Victor Mihalachi) 2:43.83
Wylenzek wins the event for the fourth time and his fifth world title overall.
Men's Kayak:
K–1 500 m:  Marek Twardowski  1:36.688  Pavel Miadzvedzeu  1:37.174  Yury Postrigay  1:38.404
Twardowski wins the event for the second time and his third world title overall.
K–2 500 m:   (Dávid Tóth, Tamás Kulifai) 1:28.134   (Ricardas Nekriosius, Andrej Olijnik) 1:28.524   (Denis Ambroziak, Dawid Putto) 1:28.848
K–4 1000 m:   (Norman Bröckl, Robert Gleinert, Max Hoff, Paul Mittelstedt) 2:47.734   (Jacob Clear, Murray Stewart, David Smith, Tate Smith) 2:48.724   (Ilya Medvedev, Anton Vasilev, Anton Ryakhov, Oleg Zhestkov) 2:49.516
Bröckl wins the event for the third time.
Hoff wins his third world title.
Women's canoe:
C–2 500 m:   (Laurence Vincent-Lapointe, Mallorie Nicholson) 2:01.028   (Anastasia Ganina, Natalia Marasanova) 2:03.440   (Kincső Takács, Gyöngyvér Baravics) 2:08.534
Vincent-Lapointe wins her second world title.
Women's Kayak:
K–1 500 m:  Nicole Reinhardt  1:47.066  Danuta Kozák  1:47.396  Inna Osypenko-Radomska  1:48.668
Reinhardt wins the event for the second time and her seventh world title overall.
K–2 500 m:   (Yvonne Schuring, Viktoria Schwarz) 1:37.071   (Franziska Weber, Tina Dietze) 1:37.275   (Beata Mikołajczyk, Aneta Konieczna) 1:37.803

Cricket
India in England:
4th Test in London, day 3:  591/6d (153 overs; Ian Bell 235);  103/5 (33 overs). India trail by 488 runs with 5 wickets remaining in the 1st innings.
Australia in Sri Lanka:
4th ODI in Hambantota:  132 (38.4 overs);  133/5 (28 overs). Australia win by 5 wickets; lead 5-match series 3–1.

Cycling
Grand Tours:
Vuelta a España, Stage 1:   16' 30"   + 4"   + 9"
General classification (after stage 1): (1) Jakob Fuglsang   16' 30" (2) Fabian Cancellara  + 0" (3) Maxime Monfort  + 0"

Equestrianism
European Dressage Championship in Rotterdam, Netherlands:
Grand Prix Spécial:  Adelinde Cornelissen  on Parzival  Carl Hester  on Uthopia  Laura Bechtolsheimer  on Mistral Hojris

Field hockey
Men's EuroHockey Nations Championship in Mönchengladbach, Germany:
Pool A:
 3–1 
 5–0 
Women's EuroHockey Nations Championship in Mönchengladbach, Germany:
Pool A:
 4–0 
 8–0 
Pool B:
 3–0 
 4–0

Football (soccer)
FIFA U-20 World Cup in Bógota, Colombia:
Third place match:   3–1 
Final:   3–2 (a.e.t.)  
Brazil win the title for the fifth time.
 Women's Professional Soccer Playoffs:
Super Semifinal in Chester, Pennsylvania: Philadelphia Independence 2–0 magicJack

Golf
Senior majors:
Constellation Energy Senior Players Championship in Harrison, New York:
Leaderboard after third round: (1) Fred Couples  202 (−11) (T2) John Cook  & Peter Senior  203 (−10)

Multi-sport events
Summer Universiade in Shenzhen, China:
Athletics:
Men's pole vault:  Łukasz Michalski  5.75m  Mateusz Didenkow  & Aleksandr Gripich  5.75m
Men's 3000m steeplechase:  Alberto Paulo  8:32.26  Halil Akkaş  8:34.57  Ildar Minshin  8:34.86
Men's 110m hurdles:  Hansle Parchment  13.24  Jiang Fan  13.55  Ronald Brookins  13.56
Women's triple jump:  Yekaterina Koneva  14.25m  Patrícia Mamona  14.23m  Cristina Ioana Bujin  14.21m
Women's shot put:  Irina Tarasova  18.02m  Sophie Kleeberg  17.48m  Meng Qianqian  17.21m
Women's 5000m:  Binnaz Uslu  15:41.15  Sara Moreira  15:45.83  Natalya Popkova  15:52.55
Women's heptathlon:  Olga Kurban  6151 points  Viktorija Žemaitytė  5958  Kateřina Cachová  5873
Cycling:
Men's team time trial:   (Sergey Shilov, Valery Kaykov, Artur Ershov, Maksim Kozyrev) 55:10.92   (Christoph Pfingsten, Grischa Janorschke, Mathias Belka, Daniel Westmattelmann) 57:55.77   (Jang Chan-jae, Jang Sun-jae, Park Sung-baek, Im Jae-yeon) 58:34.19
Women's team time trial:   (Egle Zablockyte, Aušrinė Trebaitė, Aleksandra Sošenko) 39:40.79   (Son Hee-jung, Yu Seon-ha, Lee Ae-jung) 40:26.37   (Lina-Kristin Schink, Romy Kasper, Jana Schemmer) 41:04.07
Diving:
Women's 3m springboard:  He Zi  384.70 points  Wang Han  370.00  Paola Espinosa  323.60
Golf:
Men's individual tournament:  Hideki Matsuyama   Yoshinori Fujimoto   Andrea Bolognesi 
Men's team tournament:   (Fujimoto, Hideto Kobukuro, Matsuyama, Shinji Tomimura)   (Bolognesi, Leonardo Motta, Niccolo Quintarelli, Lorenzo Scotto)   (Mauricio Azcue, Rodolfo Cazaubón, Carlos Ortiz, Gerardo Ruiz de la Concha)
Women's individual tournament:  Lin Tzu-chi   Katerina Ruzickova   Ko Min-jeong 
Women's team tournament:   (Lin, Liu Yi-chen, Yao Hsuan-yu)   (Li Jiayun, Xu Yue, Zhang Yuyang)   (Brooke Beeler, Catherine O'Donnell, Caroline Powers)
Gymnastics:
Aerobic dance:   (Che Lei, Huang Jinxuan, Lin Junxian, Liu Chao, Shou Minchao, Tao Le, Wang Yang, Zhao Sitong, Zheng Ziya, Zou Qin) 19.163   (Andreea Bogati, Laura Andreea Cristache, Valentin Mavrodineanu, Porime-Tolan Petru, Anca Claudia Surdu, Mircea Zamfir) 19.063   (Hwang In Chan, Kim Eung-soo, Kim Sung-ho, Lee Jon-gu, Lee Kyung-ho, Ryu Ju-sun, Song Sung-kyu, Yoon Chang-il, Yoon Kwang-seok, Yun Tae-hee) 18.950
Mixed pair:  Huang/Tao 21.000  Maxim Grinin/Evgeniya Kudymova  21.000  Giulia Bianchi/Emanuele Pagliuca  20.250
Sailing:
Team 470:   (Vladimir Chaus, Denis Gribanov, Alisa Kirilyuk, Liudmila Dmitrieva)   (Perry Emsiek, Scott Furnary, Zeke Horowitz, Alyssa Aitken)   (Gustavo Thiesen, Fábio Silva, Isabel Swan, Martine Grael)
Team laser radial:   (Colin Smith, Frederick Strammer, Elizabeth Barry)   (Alexandra South, Tristan Brown, James Burman)   (Mathilde de Kerangat, Jules Ferrer, Antony Munos)
Team T-293:   (Xie Lidiao, Chen Zhiwei)
Shooting:
Men's 50m rifle prone:  Yury Shcherbatsevich   Cao Yifei   Alexandr Yermakov 
Men's 10m air pistol:  Lee Dae-myung   Pang Wei   Kim Geun-bok 
Men's team 10m air pistol:      
Women's 10m air pistol:  Harveen Srao   Tanyaporn Prucksakorn   Olena Kostevych 
Women's team 10m air pistol:   (Srao, Juhi Talwar, Ruby Tomar) 1140+30   (Liubov Yaskevich, Alina Suslonova, Elena Kovalevskaya) 1136+32   (Kostevych, Yuliya Korostylova, Inna Kryachko) 1134+31
Women's team 50m rifle 3 positions:      
Women's skeet:  Monika Zemkova  96+5  Danka Barteková  96+4  Yu Xiumin  94
Women's team skeet:   (Yu, Yang Jing, Lu Min) 204   (Elvira Akchurina, Zhaniya Aidarkhanova, Angelina Michshuk) 200   (Landysh Garaeva, Albina Shakirova, Anastasia Kitaeva) 197
Table tennis (CHN unless stated):
Men's singles:  Xu Xin  Yan An  Fang Bo & Kenji Matsudaira 
Women's singles:  Rao Jingwen  Fan Ying  Ma Yuefei & Xiong Xinyun
Taekwondo:
Men's −54 kg:  Jerranat Nakaviroj   Hsu Chia-lin   Erdal Aldemir  & Park Yong-han 
Men's −68 kg:  Kim Hun   Samuel Morrison   Idulio Islas  & Cesar Mari 
Women's −46 kg:  Anastasia Valueva   Rukiye Yıldırım   Liao Wei-chun  & Itzel Adilene Manjarrez Bastidas 
Women's −57 kg:  Marlène Harnois   Hou Yuzhuo   Ekaterina Musikhina  & Kim So-hee 
Tennis:
Men's doubles:  Hsieh Cheng-peng/Lee Hsin-han   Siarhei Betau/Aliaksander Bury   Lim Yong-kyu/Seol Jae-min  & David Estruch/Pablo-Manuel Montoro-Gimenez 
Women's doubles:  Shuko Aoyama/Kotomi Takahata   Guo Lu/Li Ting   Valeria Pulido/Leticia Nazari  & Kesnia Lykina/Marta Sirotkina

Rugby union
Tri Nations Series:
Match 5:  18–5 
Standings: New Zealand,  9 points (3 matches), South Africa 5 (4).
Mid-year Tests, Week 7:
 22–26 
 23–12 
 28–13

Volleyball
FIVB World Grand Prix Third Round: (teams in bold advance to the final round)
Pool I in Hong Kong:
 3–1 
 3–1 
Pool J in Hong Kong:
 3–1 
 3–0 
Pool K in Bangkok, Thailand:
 3–0 
 1–3 
Pool L in Tokyo, Japan:
 3–2 
 3–0 
Standings (after 8 matches): Brazil 24 points, Russia 21, United States 20, Serbia 17, Italy 16, Thailand, Japan 15, China 14, South Korea, Poland 13, Germany 7, Dominican Republic, Cuba 6, Argentina 4, Kazakhstan 1, Peru 0.
Women's African Championship in Nairobi, Kenya: (teams in bold advance to the semifinals)
Group A:  3–0 
Standings (after 2 matches): Kenya,  4 points, Cameroon,  2.
Group B:
 3–1 
 2–3 
Standings: Algeria 6 points (3 matches), Tunisia 5 (3), Botswana 5 (4), Rwanda 3 (3).

August 19, 2011 (Friday)

Basketball
FIBA Africa Championship in Antananarivo, Madagascar:
Group A:
 63–78 
 63–74 
Standings (after 2 games): Nigeria 4 points, Mozambique, Mali 3, Madagascar 2.
Group C:
 65–87 
 75–82 
Standings (after 2 games): Cameroon 4 points, Egypt, Côte d'Ivoire 3, South Africa 2.

Canoeing
Sprint World Championships in Szeged, Hungary:
Men's Canoe:
C–1 1000 m:  Attila Vajda  4:04.749  David Cal  4:06.045  Vadim Menkov  4:08.151
Vajda wins the event for the second time.
C–2 500 m:   (Alexandru Dumitrescu, Victor Mihalachi) 1:45.524   (Sergiy Bezugliy, Maksym Prokopenko) 1:46.178   (Peter Kretschmer, Kurt Kuschela) 1:46.802
Dumitrescu and Mihalachi win the event for the second time and their third world title overall.
C–4 1000 m:   (Dzmitry Rabchanka, Dzmitry Vaitsishkin, Dzianis Harazha, Aleksandr Vauchetskiy) 3:26.703   (Gabriel Gheoca, Cătălin Costache, Florian Comanici, Mihail Simon) 3:28.071   (Mátyás Sáfrán, Mihály Sáfrán, Henrik Vasbányai, Szabolcs Németh) 3:28.113
The Belarusian quartet win the event for the third successive time, and all of them win their fifth world title overall.
Men's Kayak:
K–1 1000 m:  Adam van Koeverden  3:36.194  Anders Gustafsson  3:39.488  Eirik Verås Larsen  3:39.818
van Koeverden wins his second world title.
K–2 1000 m:   (Peter Gelle, Erik Vlček) 3:20.626   (Markus Oscarsson, Henrik Nilsson) 3:21.478   (Vitaly Yurchenko, Vasily Pogrebn) 3:21.544
Vlček wins his seventh world title.
Women's Kayak:
K–1 1000 m:  Tamara Csipes  4:11.388  Krisztina Fazekas Zur  4:13.470  Naomi Flood  4:14.124
Csipes wins her third world title.
K–2 1000 m:   (Anne Knorr, Debora Niche) 3:50.614   (Berenike Faldum, Daniela Nedeva) 3:50.950   (Alíz Sarudi, Erika Medveczky) 3:53.416
K–4 500 m:   (Gabriella Szabó, Danuta Kozák, Katalin Kovács, Dalma Benedek) 1:36.339   (Carolin Leonhardt, Silke Hörmann, Franziska Weber, Tina Dietze) 1:37.521   (Iryna Pamialova, Nadzeya Papok, Volha Khudzenka, Maryna Paltaran) 1:37.887
Kovács wins the event for the eighth time, and her 30th world title overall. She also becomes the most decorated paddler with 39 world championships medals.
Benedek wins the event for the third successive time and her seventh world title overall.
Kozák wins the event for the second time and her fourth world title overall.
Szabó wins her fourth world title.

Cricket
India in England:
4th Test in London, day 2:  457/3 (123 overs; Ian Bell 181*, Kevin Pietersen 175); .
Bangladesh in Zimbabwe:
4th ODI in Bulawayo:  199 (48.2 overs; Brendan Taylor 106);  203/4 (36.4 overs). Bangladesh win by 6 wickets; Zimbabwe lead 5-match series 3–1.

Golf
Senior majors:
Constellation Energy Senior Players Championship in Harrison, New York:
Leaderboard after second round: (1) Fred Couples  134 (−8) (2) Peter Senior  135 (−7) (3) Corey Pavin  136 (−6)

Multi-sport events
Summer Universiade in Shenzhen, China:
Athletics:
Men's 400m hurdles:  Jeshua Anderson  49.03  Takayuki Kishimoto  49.52  Kurt Couto  49.61
Men's javelin throw:  Fatih Avan  83.79m  Roman Avramenko  81.42m  Igor Janik  79.65m
Men's 200m:  Rasheed Dwyer  20.20  Thuso Mpuang  & Jason Young  20.59
Women's 20 km walk:  Júlia Takács  1:33:51  Tatyana Shemyakina  1:34:23  Nina Okhotnikova  1:35:10
Women's team 20 km walk:   (Shi Yang, Yang Yawei, Wang Shanshan) 4:58:57
Women's hammer throw:  Zalina Marghieva  72.93m  Éva Orbán  71.33m  Bianca Perie  71.18m
Women's pole vault:  Aleksandra Kiryashova  4.65m  Tina Šutej  4.55m  Katerina Stefanidi  4.45m
Women's 200m:  Anneisha McLaughlin  22.54  Tiffany Townsend  22.96  Anna Kaygorodova  23.16
Women's 100m hurdles:  Nia-Sifaatihii Ali  12.85  Natalya Ivoninskaya  13.16  Christina Manning  13.17
Women's 3000m steeplechase:  Binnaz Uslu  9:33.50  Ludmina Kuzmina  9:44.77  Jin Yuan  9:45.21
Beach volleyball:
Women's tournament:  Karla Borger–Britta Büthe   Heather Hughes–Emily Day   Elize Secomana–Agatha Bednarczur 
Cycling:
Men's keirin:  Zhang Miao   Pavel Yakushevskiy   Florian Vernay 
Women's points race:  Lesya Kalytovska  40 points  Anastasia Chulkova  37  Minami Uwano  32
Diving:
Men's 1m springboard:  Lin Jin  487.00 points  Sun Zhiyi  460.20  Illya Kvasha  454.55
Women's synchro 10m platform:  Wang Xin/Chen Ruolin  349.98 points  Paola Espinosa/Tatiana Ortiz  330.48  Pandelela Rinong/Leong Mun Yee  316.98
Shooting (CHN unless stated):
Men's 25m rapid fire pistol:  Ding Feng  Zhou Zhiguo  Li Yuehong
Men's 25m team rapid fire pistol:   (Ding, Li, Zhou)   (Boris Artaud, Fabrice Daumal, Thibaut Sauvage)   (Rinat Ayupov, Dmitry Brayko, Ivan Stukachev)
Men's trap:  Marco Panizza  146  Jakub Trzebiński  144+1  Simone Prosperi  144
Men's team trap:   (Prosperi, Andrea Miotto, Panizza) 363   (Li Yang, Liu Jie, Du Yu) 357   (Trzebiński, Łukasz Szum, Piotr Kowalczyk) 349
Men's 50m team rifle prone:   (Yury Shcherbatsevich, Tsimafei Vyshynski, Illia Charheika) 1773+104   (Bishrel Boldbaatar, Ganzorig Dondov, Nyantain Bayaraa) 1773+90   (Philip Järpenby, Sam Andersson, Viktor Webeklint) 1769+92
Women's 50m rifle prone:  Li Peijing  Wang Chengyi  Marli Vlok 
Women's 50m team rifle prone:   (Wang, Lan Yuwen, Li) 1780+116   (Daria Vdovina, Anna Sushko, Valentina Protasova) 1770+92   (Ratchadaporn Plengsaengthong, Sununta Majchacheep, Vitchuda Pichitkanjanakul) 1768+90
Swimming:
Men's 50m freestyle:  Lucio Spadaro  22.30  Adam Small  22.31  Shinri Shioura  22.37
Men's 1500m freestyle:  Rocco Potenza  15:00.57  Yohsuke Miyamoto  15:04.86  Sergii Frolov  15:06.17
Men's 4 × 100 m medley relay:   (Ryosuke Irie, Ryo Tateishi, Masayuki Kishida, Shioura) 3:35.02   (Rexford Tullius, Adam Klein, Tim Phillips, Jimmy Feigen) 3:37.92   (Gareth Kean, Glenn Snyders, Kurt Bassett, Matthew Stanley) 3:38.75
Women's 50m freestyle:  Aleksandra Gerasimenya  24.66  Darya Stepanyuk  25.12  Cate Campbell  25.17
Women's 200m backstroke:  Shiho Sakai  2:09.75  Hilary Caldwell  2:11.12  Duane Da Rocha Marcé  2:11.24
Women's 100m breaststroke:  Sun Ye  1:07.53  Tera van Beilen  1:08.24  Satomi Suzuki  1:08.45
Table tennis (CHN unless stated):
Men's doubles:  Xu Xin/Yan An  Wang Yi-tse/Chen Chien-an   Shang Kun/Fang Bo & Jin Ueda/Kenji Matsudaira 
Women's doubles:  Ma Yuefei/Rao Jingwen  Xiong Xinyun/Tang Liying  Iveta Vacenovská/Dana Hadačová  & Jee Min-hyung/Moon Mi-ra 
Taekwondo:
Men's team poomsae:   (An Jae-seong, Jang Jun-hee, Lee Sang-mok)   (Guo Fan, Zhu Yuxiang, Zhan Wenpeng)   (Hossein Beheshti, Hamid Nazarigharehchomagh, Armin Akbari) &  (Le Trung Anh, Le Hieu Nghia, Dinh Toan Nguyen)
Women's team poomsae:   (Cho Sung-yae, Jung Seu-min, Kang Yu-jin)   (Nastaran Maleki Aderani, Mahsa Mardani, Golsoum Mollamadadkhani)   (Zhan Qi, Zhang Jingjing, Zhu Mengxue) &  (Thi Le Kim Nguyen, Thi Thu Ngan Nguyen, Van Chau Tuyet)
Mixed team poomsae:   (Lee Jin-ho, Kang Su-ji)   (Thi Thu Ngan Nguyen, Le Hieu Nghia)   (Claudia Beaujean, Thomas Sommer) &  (Gerardo García, Ollin Medina)

Rugby union
Mid-year Tests, Week 7:  20–32

Volleyball
FIVB World Grand Prix Third Round: (teams in bold advance to the final round)
Pool I in Hong Kong:
 0–3 
 3–0 
Pool J in Hong Kong:
 3–0 
 3–0 
Pool K in Bangkok, Thailand:
 0–3 
 3–0 
Pool L in Tokyo, Japan:
 2–3 
 0–3 
Standings (after 7 matches): Brazil 21 points, Russia 19, United States 17, Italy, Serbia 16, South Korea, Poland 13, Thailand, Japan 12, China 11, Cuba 6, Argentina, Germany 4, Dominican Republic 3, Kazakhstan 1, Peru 0.
Women's African Championship in Nairobi, Kenya:
Group A:  3–0 
Standings: Egypt 4 points (2 matches),  2 (1), Nigeria 2 (2),  1 (1).
Group B:
 0–3 
 1–3 
Standings: Senegal 5 points (3 matches), Algeria,  4 (2), Botswana 3 (3), Rwanda 2 (2).

August 18, 2011 (Thursday)

Basketball
FIBA Africa Championship in Antananarivo, Madagascar:
Group B:
 65–79 
 115–56 
Group D:
 103–56 
 89–61

Cricket
India in England:
4th Test in London, day 1:  75/0 (26 overs); .

Equestrianism
European Dressage Championship in Rotterdam, Netherlands:
Team competition:   (Emile Faurie, Charlotte Dujardin, Carl Hester, Laura Bechtolsheimer)   (Helen Langehanenberg, Christoph Koschel, Isabell Werth, Matthias Alexander Rath)   (Sander Marijnissen, Hans Peter Minderhoud, Edward Gal, Adelinde Cornelissen)

Football (soccer)
UEFA Europa League Play-off round first leg:
Legia Warsaw  2–2  Spartak Moscow
Ekranas  1–0  Hapoel Tel Aviv
Lokomotiv Moscow  2–0  Spartak Trnava
Vaslui  2–0  Sparta Prague
Zestafoni  3–3  Club Brugge
HJK Helsinki  2–0  Schalke 04
Litex Lovech  1–2  Dynamo Kyiv
Vorskla Poltava  2–1  Dinamo București
Aalesund  2–1  AZ
Omonia  2–1  Red Bull Salzburg
Austria Wien  3–1  Gaz Metan Mediaș
Maccabi Tel Aviv  3–0  Panathinaikos
Steaua București  2–0  CSKA Sofia
Thun  0–1  Stoke City
Beşiktaş  3–0  Alania Vladikavkaz
Bursaspor  1–2  Anderlecht
PAOK  2–0  Karpaty Lviv
Nordsjælland  0–0  Sporting CP
Śląsk Wrocław  1–3  Rapid București
Standard Liège  1–0  Helsingborg
Metalist Kharkiv  0–0  Sochaux
Fulham  3–0  Dnipro Dnipropetrovsk
Hannover 96  2–1  Sevilla
Red Star Belgrade  1–2  Rennes
Shamrock Rovers  1–1  Partizan
Rosenborg  0–0  AEK Larnaca
Slovan Bratislava  1–0  Roma
Differdange 03  0–4  Paris Saint-Germain
Heart of Midlothian  0–5  Tottenham Hotspur
Maribor  2–1  Rangers
Nacional  0–0  Birmingham City
AEK Athens  1–0  Dinamo Tbilisi
Athletic Bilbao  0–0  Trabzonspor
Lazio  6–0  Rabotnički
Celtic  0–0  Sion
Ried  0–0  PSV Eindhoven
Atlético Madrid  2–0  Vitória Guimarães
Braga  0–0  Young Boys
Copa Sudamericana First stage:
First leg: La Equidad  2–0  Juan Aurich
Second leg (first leg score in parentheses): Fénix  0–0 (0–1)  Universidad de Chile. Universidad de Chile win 4–1 on points.
CONCACAF Champions League Group Stage Matchday 1:
Group C: Tauro  1–2  Toronto FC

Golf
Senior majors:
Constellation Energy Senior Players Championship in Harrison, New York:
Leaderboard after first round: (1) Jeff Sluman  65 (−6) (T2) Gary Hallberg  & Peter Senior  66 (−5)

Multi-sport events
Summer Universiade in Shenzhen, China:
Archery:
Men's team compound:   (Sébastien Brasseur, Joanna Chesse, Pascale Lebecque)   (Gerardo Alvarado, Angel Ramírez, Cuauhtémoc Rodríguez)   (Adam Gallant, Zachary Plannick, Adam Wruck)
Men's team recurve:   (Chang Liang, Liu Zhaowu, Ren Jinke)   (Shohei Ota, Hiroki Suetake, Hiroyuki Yoshinaga)   (Thomas Aubert, Geoffrey Barthelot, Thomas Faucheron)
Women's team compound:   (Kim Hyo-sun, Seo Jung-hee, Seok Ji-hyun)   (Natalia Avdeeva, Viktoria Balzhanova, Polina Nikitina)   (Gagandeep Kaur, Anjali Kumari, Sunita Rani)
Women's team recurve:   (Han Gyeong-hee, Jung Dasomi, Ki Bo-bae)   (Tetyana Dorokhova, Olena Kushniruk, Nina Mylchenko)   (Cho Pei-chin, Le Chieh-Ying, Yuan Shu-chi)
Mixed team compound:   (Min Li-hong, Seo)   (Kendal Nicely, Plannick)   (Anastasia Anastasio, Jacopo Polidori)
Mixed team recurve:   (Ki, Kim Bub-min)   (Tien Kang, Yuan)   (Dmytro Hrachov, Mylchenko)
Athletics (RUS unless stated):
Men's 20 km walk:  Andrey Krivov 1:24:15  Mikhail Ryzhov 1:24:26  Andrés Chocho  1:24:44
Men's team 20 km walk:   (Krivov, Ryzhov, Andrey Ruzavin) 4:19:19   (Cai Zelin, Yu Wei, Niu Wenbin) 4:24:56
Men's 1500m:  Imad Touil  3:48.13  Abdelmadjed Touil  3:48.24  Valentin Smirnov 3:48.45
Men's high jump:  Bohdan Bondarenko  2.28m  Wojciech Theiner  2.26m  Sergey Mudrov 2.24m
Men's 400m:  Marcell Deák-Nagy  45.50  Peter Matthews  45.62  Sean Wroe  45.93
Men's triple jump:  Nelson Évora  17.31m  Viktor Kuznietsov  16.89m  Yevgeniy Ektov  16.83m
Men's decathlon:  Vasiliy Kharlamov 8166 points  Gaël Quérin  7857  Mikhail Logvinenko 7835
Women's 400m hurdles:  Hanna Yaroshchuk  55.15  Irina Davydova 55.50  Nagihan Karadere  55.81
Women's 800m:  Olha Zavhorodnya  1:59.56  Elena Kofanova 1:59.94  Liliya Lobanova  2:00.42
Women's 400m:  Olga Topilskaya 51.63  Yelena Migunova 51.77  Olga Tereshkova  52.36
Women's javelin throw:  Sunette Viljoen  66.47m  Marina Maximova 59.87m  Justine Robbeson  59.78m
Badminton:
Mixed team:   (Ricky Widianto, Shendy Puspa Irawati, Senatria Agus Setia Putra, Bellaetrix Manuputty, Rian Agung Saputro, Angga Pratama, Komala Dewi, Jenna Gozali, Hera Desi Ana Rachmawati, Rendy Sugiarto, Afiat Yuris Wirawan)   (Li Tian, Chen Ni, Wen Kai, Shi Xiao Qian, Tao Xun, Chen Yulu, Hu Wenqing, Lin Qing, Liu Fang Hua, Ye Ao Ting)   (Savitree Amitrapai, Suppanyu Avihingsanon, Bodin Isara, Nitchaon Jindapol, Maneepong Jongjit, Chanida Julrattanamanee, Nessara Somsri, Prinyawat Thongnuam) &  (Chang Hsin-yun, Cheng Shao-chieh, Chou Tien-chen, Fang Chieh-min, Hsieh Pei-chen, Hsueh Hsuan-yi, Lai Chia-wen, Lee Sheng-mu, Liao Min-chun, Pai Hsia-oma, Wang Pei-rong, Wu Chun-wei)
Beach volleyball:
Men's tournament:  Michal Kadziola–Jakub Szalankiewicz   Sergey Prokopyev–Yury Bogatov   Sergiy Popov–Valeriy Samoday 
Cycling:
Men's points race:  Artur Ershov  47 points  Bernhard Oberholzer  36  Choi Seung-woo  26
Men's sprint:  Denis Dmitriev   Pavel Yakushevskiy   Zhang Miao 
Women's sprint:  Guo Shuang   Victoria Baranova   Virginie Cueff 
Diving:
Women's 10m platform:  Paola Espinosa  385.25 points  Pandelela Rinong  381.75  Wang Xin  370.55
Fencing:
Men's team foil:   (Lei Sheng, Huang Liangcai, Zhu Jun, Chen Min)   (Alessio Foconi, Tommaso Lari, Martino Minuto, Luca Simoncelli)   (Aleksey Khovanskiy, Igor Zapozdaev, Artur Akhmatkhuzin), Dmitry Komissarov)
Women's team sabre:   (Chen Xiaodong, Xia Min, Li Fei, Yuan Tingting)   (Alina Komashchuk, Olena Khomrova, Olha Kharlan, Halyna Pundyk)   (Choi Soo-yeon, Kim Ji-yeon, Lee Ra-jin)
Shooting:
Men's 50m pistol individual:  Lee Dae-myung   Damir Mikec   Mai Jiajie 
Men's 50m pistol team:   (Mai, Pang Wei, Wang Zhiwei) 1678+28 points   (Lee, Gil Yang-sup, Jang Ha-lim) 1670+26   (Tomasz Palamarz, Tomasz Wawrzonowski, Witosław Krzak) 1635+23
Men's 10m air rifle individual:  Niccolò Campriani   Yu Jae Chul   Gong Jiawei 
Men's 10m air rifle team:   (Campriani, Tommaso Leonardi, Giovanni Matraxia) 1786+137   (Gong, Cao Yifei, Zhang Qiang) 1781+135   (Nazar Luginets, Andrey Konkov, Vladimir Tugushev) 1775+128
Women's 10m air rifle individual:  Petra Zublasing   Lisa Ungerank   Manuela Christel Felix 
Women's 10m air rifle team:   (Wang Weiyang, Xie Jieqiong, Lan Yuwen) 1187+85   (Kim Sun-hwa, Jeong Gyung-suk, Choi Yoon-jung) 1181+90   (Daria Vdovina, Valentina Protasova, Anna Sushko) 1180+86
Women's trap:  Jana Beckmann  94  Catherine Skinner  93  Kang Gee-eun  92+2
Swimming:
Men's 400m individual medley:  László Cseh  4:12.67  Yuya Horihata  4:13.66  Will Harris  4:15.40
Men's 50m breaststroke:  Glenn Snyders  27.37  João Gomes Júnior  27.60  Mattia Pesce  27.80
Men's 200m freestyle:  Matthew McLean  1:47.44  Clement Lefert  1:47.78  Sho Uchida  1:49.06
Women's 1500m freestyle:  Haley Anderson  16:21.72  Melania Costa-Schmid  16:21.79  Lauren Boyle  16:26.37
Women's 50m backstroke:  Jennifer Connelly  27.92  Aleksandra Gerasimenya  27.93  Grace Loh  28.37
Women's 200m butterfly:  Jessica Dickons  2:08.91  Natsumi Hoshi  2:08.94  Choi Hye-ra  2:09.35
Women's 4 × 100 m medley relay:   (Gao Chang, Sun Ye, Lu Ying, Tang Yi) 3:59.15   (Connolly, Ann Chandler, Lyndsay DePaul, Megan Romano) 4:00.15   (Shiho Sakai, Satomi Suzuki, Tomoyo Fukuda, Yayoi Matsumoto) 4:00.98
Table tennis:
Mixed doubles:  Shang Kun/Rao Jingwen   Kentaro Miuchi/Yuka Ishigaki   Lee Jae-hun/Kim So-ri  & Huang Sheng-sheng/Huang Yi-hua 
Taekwondo:
Men's individual poomsae:  Zhu Yuxiang   Yang Ju-min   Dinh Toan Nguyen  & Ali Nadali Najafabadi 
Women's individual poomsae:  Zhang Jingjing   Mahsa Mardani   Park Ji-young  & Ollin Medina 
Weightlifting:
Men's 105 kg:  Gennady Muratov  400 kg  Mykola Hordiychuk  382 kg  Aleksey Lovchev  375 kg
Men's +105 kg:  Mohamed Masoud  412 kg  Péter Nagy  412 kg  Oleg Proshak  402 kg
Women's +75 kg:  Anastasia Chernykh  250 kg  Alexandra Aborneva  247 kg  Daryna Goncharova  245 kg

Volleyball
Women's African Championship in Nairobi, Kenya:
Group A:  3–2 
Group B:
 3–1 
 3–0 
Standings: Tunisia 4 points (2 matches), Senegal 3 (2),  2 (1), Botswana 2 (2), Rwanda 1 (1).

August 17, 2011 (Wednesday)

Basketball
FIBA Africa Championship in Antananarivo, Madagascar:
Group A:
 84–59 
 67–77 
Group C:
 105–53 
 96–81

Football (soccer)
FIFA U-20 World Cup in Colombia:
Semifinals:
 0–2  in Medellín
 2–0  in Pereira
UEFA Champions League Play-off round first leg:
Wisła Kraków  1–0  APOEL
Maccabi Haifa  2–1  Genk
Dinamo Zagreb  4–1  Malmö FF
Odense  1–0  Villarreal
Bayern Munich  2–0  Zürich
Copa Sudamericana First stage second leg: (first leg scores in parentheses)
Nacional  1–0 (0–0)  San José. Nacional win 4–1 on points.
LDU Quito  1–0 (1–1)  Yaracuyanos. LDU Quito win 4–1 on points.
CONCACAF Champions League Group Stage Matchday 1:
Group B: Colorado Rapids  3–2  Isidro Metapán
Group C: UNAM  0–1  FC Dallas
Group D: Herediano  0–5  Monterrey
 Supercopa de España second leg (first leg score in parentheses): Barcelona 3–2 (2–2) Real Madrid. Barcelona win 5–4 on aggregate.
Barcelona win the Supercopa for the third consecutive year, and tenth time overall.
 Women's Professional Soccer Playoffs:
First round in Boca Raton, Florida: magicJack 3–1 Boston Breakers

Multi-sport events
Summer Universiade in Shenzhen, China:
Archery (KOR unless stated):
Men's recurve individual:  Im Dong-hyun  Kim Woo-jin  Kim Bub-min
Women's recurve individual:  Ki Bo-bae  Jung Dasomi  Cho Pei-chin 
Athletics:
Men's hammer throw:  Paweł Fajdek  78.14m  Marcel Lomnický  73.90m  Lorenzo Povegliano  73.39m
Men's 100m:  Jacques Harvey  10.14  Rytis Sakalauskas  10.14  Su Bingtian  10.27
Men's 10,000m:  Suguru Osako  28:42.83  Stephen Mokoka  28:53.09  Ahmed Tamri  29:06.20
Women's long jump:  Anna Nazarova  6.72m  Iuliia Pidluzhnaia  6.56m  Melanie Bauschke  6.51m
Women's discus throw:  Żaneta Glanc  63.99m  Zinaida Sendriūtė  62.49m  Svetlana Saykina  60.81m
Women's 100m:  Carrie Russell  11.05  Khrystyna Stuy  11.34  Lina Grinčikaitė  11.44
Cycling:
Men's individual pursuit:  Sergei Shilov  4:30.927  Artur Ershov  4:33.128  Jang Sun-jae  4:26.229
Women's individual pursuit:  Vilija Sereikaitė  3:36.944  Lesya Kalytovska  3:40.068  Svitlana Halyuk  3:41.003
Diving:
Men's 3m springboard:  He Chong  539.30 points  Julian Sanchez Gallegos  515.50  Ilya Zakharov  471.95
Fencing:
Men's épée team:   (Nikita Glazkov, Sergey Khodos, Alexander Velikanov, Vseslav Morgoev)   (Alex Fava, Virgile Marchal, Adrien Penso-Tsai, Alexandre Bardenet)   (Péter Szényi, Dániel Budai, Márk Hanczvikkel)
Women's foil team:   (Viktoria Kozyreva, Yuliya Biryukova, Kamilla Gafurzianova, Yulia Rashidova)   (Hanna Lyczbinska, Marta Lyczbinska, Katarzyna Kryczało, Karolina Chlewińska)   (Berangere Genevois, Maëva Roulin, Ysaora Thibus, Clarisse Luminet)
Judo:
Men's team:   (Ryunosuke Haga, Ryohei Anai, Takeshi Ojitani, Masaru Momose, Yuito Yoshida, Toru Shishime, Tomohiro Kawakami, Yasuhiro Awano)   (Florent Urani, Antoine Jeannin, Thibault Dracius, Alexandre Iddir, Farid Ben Ali, Mathieu Thorel, Clement Delvert)   (Hong Suk-woong, Hwang Bo-bae, Song Soo-keun), Kim Won-jung, Kim Sung-min) &  (Andriy Burdun, Anatoliy Laskuta, Quedjau Nhabali, Ivan Iefanov, Vitaliy Popovych, Razmik Tonoyan, Oleksandr Sizov)
Women's team:   (Kanae Yamabe, Yuko Imai, Aya Ishiyama, Shori Hamada, Yuki Hashimoto, Kaori Kondo, Miki Tanaka, Megumi Ishikawa)   (Ye Meixin, Guan Chunming, Lin Meiling, Yu Song, Zhang Jie, Chen Rong)   (Emilie Andeol, Hélène Receveaux, Valériane Etienne, Géraldine Mentouopou, Aurore Urani Climence, Elodie Grou, Heloise Lacouchie) &  (Joanna Jaworska, Agata Ozdoba, Zuzanna Pawlikowska, Agata Perenc, Katarzyna Furmanek)
Swimming:
Men's 100m butterfly:  Tim Phillips  52.06  Tom Shields  52.62  Paweł Korzeniowski  52.96
Men's 400m freestyle:  David McKeon  3:48.78  Michael Klueh  3:48.84  Sho Uchida  3:51.93
Men's 200m individual medley:  László Cseh  1:57.86  Yuya Horihata  1:59.74  Yuma Kosaka  1:59.81
Women's 50m breaststroke:  Ann Chandler  31.13  Tera van Beilen  31.45  Valentina Artemyeva  31.74
Women's 100m butterfly:  Lu Ying  57.86  Tomoyo Fukuda  59.08  Alice Mills  59.11
Women's 100m backstroke:  Shiho Sakai  1:00.28  Jennifer Connelly  1:00.50  Aleksandra Gerasimenya  1:00.91
Women's 4 × 200 m freestyle relay:   (Karlee Bispo, Chelsea Nauta, Kate Dwelley, Megan Romano) 7:55.02   (Natasha Hind, Melissa Ingram, Amaka Gessler, Lauren Boyle) 7:59.60   (Tang Yi, Zhu Qianwei, Liu Jing, Lu) 7:59.62
Weightlifting:
Men's 94 kg:  Andrey Demanov  390 kg  Aurimas Didžbalis  387 kg  İbrahim Arat  373 kg
Women's 69 kg:  Yue Kang  240 kg  Mun Yu-ra  238 kg  Marie-Ève Beauchemin-Nadeau  235 kg
Women's 75 kg:  Khanittha Petanang  236 kg  Yang Li  234 kg  Lee Ae-ra  226 kg

Volleyball
Women's African Championship in Nairobi, Kenya:
Group A:  0–3 
Group B:
 0–3 
 1–3

August 16, 2011 (Tuesday)

Cricket
Bangladesh in Zimbabwe:
3rd ODI in Harare:  250/7 (50 overs);  245 (49.2 overs; Mushfiqur Rahim 101). Zimbabwe win by 5 runs; lead 5-match series 3–0.
Australia in Sri Lanka:
3rd ODI in Colombo:  286/9 (50 overs; Upul Tharanga 111);  208 (44.2 overs; Lasith Malinga 5/28). Sri Lanka win by 78 runs; Australia lead 5-match series 2–1.

Football (soccer)
UEFA Champions League Play-off round first leg:
Copenhagen  1–3  Viktoria Plzeň
BATE Borisov  1–1  Sturm Graz
Twente  2–2  Benfica
Arsenal  1–0  Udinese
Lyon  3–1  Rubin Kazan
Copa Sudamericana First stage second leg: (first leg scores in parentheses)
Universidad Católica  3–0 (1–1)  Bella Vista. Universidad Católica win 4–1 on points.
Deportivo Anzoátegui  2–0 (0–1)  Deportivo Quito. 3–3 on points; Deportivo Anzoátegui win 2–1 on aggregate.
CONCACAF Champions League Group Stage Matchday 1:
Group A:
Los Angeles Galaxy  2–0  Motagua
Alajuelense  1–0  Morelia
Group B: Santos Laguna  3–2  Real España
Group D: Seattle Sounders  4–1  Comunicaciones

Multi-sport events
Summer Universiade in Shenzhen, China:
Archery:
Men's compound individual:  Alexander Dambaev   Choi Yong-hee   Sébastien Brasseur 
Women's compound individual:  Polina Nikitina   Kendal Nicely   Viktoria Balzhanova 
Athletics:
Men's shot put:  O'Dayne Richards  19.93m  Soslan Tsyrikhov  19.80m  Mason Finley  19.72m
Women's 10,000m:  Fadime Suna  33:11.92  Hanae Tanaka  33:15.57  Mai Ishibashi  33:41.90
Cycling:
Women's 500m time trial:  Gong Jinjie  34.910  Lyubov Shulika  34.985  Victoria Baranova  34.996
Diving:
Men's synchro 3m springboard:   (Qin Kai, Lin Jin) 419.07 points   (Rommel Pacheco, Jonathan Ruvalcaba) 385.32   (Yu Okamoto, Sho Sakai) 374.40
Women's 1m springboard:  Shi Tingmao  320.65 points  Kelci Bryant  304.00  Chen Ye  283.30
Fencing:
Men's team sabre:   (Dmytro Boyko, Oleh Shturbabin, Andriy Yagodka, Dmytro Pundyk)   (Marco Tricarico, Massimiliano Murolo, Luigi Miracco, Stefano Sbragia)   (Heo Young-gu, Gu Bon-gil, Hwang Byung-yul)
Women's team épée:   (Melissa Goram, Lauren Rembi, Marie-Gabrielle Fayolle, Mathilde Grumier)   (Courtney Hurley, Kelley Hurley, Susannah Scanlan, Holly Buechel)   (Vlada Vlasova, Elena Shasharina, Tatiana Andryushina, Maya Guchmazova)
Gymnastics:
Men's floor:  Flavius Koczi  15.450 points  Ryūzō Sejima  15.225  Shoichi Yamamoto  15.000
Men's pommel horse:  Prashanth Sellathurai  15.700 points  Donna-Donny Truyens  15.175  Koczi 15.150
Men's rings:  Arthur Zanetti  15.600 points  Samir Aït Saïd  15.500  Chen Chih-yu  15.050
Men's vault:  Koczi 16.237 points  Nathan Gafuik  16.112  Cheng Ran  16.075
Men's parallel bars:  Wang Guanyin  15.850 points  Marius Berbecar  & Liu Rongbing  15.175
Men's horizontal bar:  Chen Xuezhang  15.875 points  Mykola Kuksenkov  15.550  Hiroki Ishikawa  15.500
Women's vault:  Jo Hyun-joo  14.087 points  Anna Myzdrikova  13.800  Alena Polyan  & Wong Hiuyingangel  13.650
Women's uneven bars:  Yu Minobe  14.475 points  Mai Yamagishi  14.250  Angelina Kysla  13.850
Women's beam:  Minobe 14.475 points  Guan Wenii  14.000  Yamagishi 13.825
Women's floor:  Polyan 14.325 points  Keiko Mukumoto  13.725  Xiao Kangjun  13.475
Judo:
Women's −48 kg:  Kaori Kondo   Kristina Rumyantseva   Violeta Dumitru  & Aurore Urani Climence 
Men's −60 kg:  Kim Won-jin   Chinbat Otgon   Robert Mshvidobadze  & Toru Shishime 
Women's Open:  Kim Ji-youn   Aya Ishiyama   Claudirene César  & Emilie Andeol 
Men's Open:  Kim Sung-min   Renat Saidov   Masaru Momose  & David Silva 
Swimming:
Men's 50m backstroke:  Ryosuke Irie  25.11  Guy Barnea  25.21  Sergey Makov  25.42
Women's 400m individual medley:  Madeline Dirado  4:40.79  Miho Takahashi  4:42.28  Jördis Steinegger  4:43.30
Men's 100m freestyle:  Jimmy Feigen  49.26  Norbert Trandafir  49.41  Shinri Shioura  49.50
Men's 100m breaststroke:  Giedrius Titenis  1:00.39  Glenn Snyders  1:00.71  João Gomes Júnior  1:00.78
Women's 200m breaststroke:  Sun Ye  2:24.63  Andrea Kropp  2:26.18  Satomi Suzuki  2:26.67
Women's 200m freestyle:  Melania Costa-Schmid  1:57.98  Lauren Boyle  1:59.19  Karlee Bispo  1:59.31
Men's 4 × 200 m freestyle relay:   (Michael Klueh, Daxon Hill, Matthew Bartlett, Matthew McLean) 7:13.54   (Sho Sotodate, Yuya Horihata, Yuma Kosaka, Sho Uchida) 7:14.66   (David McKeon, Mitchell Dixon, Kristopher Taylor, Nic Ffrost) 7:17.58
Table tennis:
Men's team:   (Fang Bo, Hu Bingtao, Shang Kun, Xu Xin, Yan An)   (Ryusuke Karube, Hiromitsu Kasahara, Kenji Matsudaira, Kentaro Miuchi, Jin Ueda)   (Chen Chien-an, Fu En-ti, Huang Shang-sheng, Shen Chi-min, Wang Yi-tse) &  (Thomas Le Breton, Emmanuel Lebesson, Adrien Mattenet, Abdel-Kader Salifou)
Women's team:   (Fan Ying, Ma Yuefei, Rao Jingwen, Tang Liying, Xiong Xinyun)   (Yuko Fujii, Yuka Ishigaki, Marina Matsuzawa, Shiho Ono, Yuri Yamanashi)   (Ioana Ghemes, Elisabeta Samara, Anamaria Sebe) &  (Chen Szu-yu, Cheng I-ching, Huang Yi-hua, Lee I-chen, Liu Hsing-yin)
Weightlifting:
Women's 63 kg:  Hsiao Chun-ho  211 kg  Kim Yun-jong  207 kg  Seda Ince  203 kg
Men's 85 kg:  Rinat Kireev  365 kg  Zhang Shichong  353 kg  Ryu Jun-h  351 kg

August 15, 2011 (Monday)

Auto racing
Sprint Cup Series:
Heluva Good! Sour Cream Dips at The Glen in Watkins Glen, New York: (1)  Marcos Ambrose (Ford; Richard Petty Motorsports) (2)  Brad Keselowski (Dodge; Penske Racing) (3)  Kyle Busch (Toyota; Joe Gibbs Racing)
Ambrose becomes the first Australian to win a Cup Series race.
Drivers' championship standings (after 22 of 36 races): (1) Busch 752 points (3 wins) (2)  Carl Edwards (Ford; Roush Fenway Racing) 752 (1 win) (3)  Jimmie Johnson (Chevrolet; Hendrick Motorsports) 746

Baseball
 The Minnesota Twins' Jim Thome becomes the eighth player in Major League Baseball history with 600 career home runs, reaching the mark with a three-run shot off Daniel Schlereth in the Twins' 9–5 win over the Detroit Tigers.

Multi-sport events
Summer Universiade in Shenzhen, China:
Cycling:
Men's cross country:  Pavel Pryadein  1h 30' 36"  Silvio Büsser  + 1' 47"  Jiří Hudeček  + 2' 17"
Women's cross country:  Ksenia Kirillova  1h 12' 24"  Maaris Meier  + 1' 47"  Melanie Gay  + 7' 21"
Fencing:
Men's foil individual:  Martino Minuto   Lei Sheng   Zhu Jun  & Heo Jun 
Women's sabre individual:  Olha Kharlan   Bianca Alexandra Pascu   Au Yeung Wai Sum  & Kim Ji-yeon 
Gymnastics:
Men's individual all-around:  Mykola Kuksenkov  89.050 points  Shoichi Yamamoto  88.900  Nathan Gafuik  88.350
Women's individual all-around:  Xiao Kangjun  56.700 points  Mai Yamagishi  56.100  Alena Polyan  55.350
Judo:
Women's −52 kg:  Zuzanna Pawlikowska   Seo Ha Na   Yuki Hashimoto  & Meriem Moussa 
Men's −66 kg:  Hwang Bo-bae   Yuito Yoshida   Florent Urani  & Ma Duanbin 
Women's −57 kg:  Megumi Ishikawa   Kim Jan-di   Hélène Receveaux  & Hannah Luise Brück 
Men's −73 kg:  Denis Yartsev   Kim Won-jung   Marcelo Contini  & Piotr Kurkiewicz 
Swimming:
Men's 50m butterfly:  Tim Phillips  23.51  Paolo Facchinelli  23.85  Masayuki Kishida  23.93
Women's 400m freestyle:  Lauren Boyle  4:07.78  Melania Costa-Schmid  4:07.97  Stephanie Peacock  4:10.25
Men's 800m freestyle:  Michael Klueh  7:52.31  Rocco Potenza  7:53.45  Yohsuke Miyamoto  7:56.29
Men's 100m backstroke:  Gareth Kean  54.71  Juan Miguel Rando  54.94  Kurt Bassett  & Sebastiano Ranfagni  55.21
Women's 200m individual medley:  Izumi Kato  2:13.52  Choi Hye-ra  2:14.17  Liu Jing  2:14.39
Women's 100m freestyle:  Tang Yi  54.24  Darya Stepanyuk  55.32  Megan Romano  55.38
Men's 4 × 100 m freestyle relay:   (Jimmy Feigen, Phillips, Kohlton Norys, Robert Savulich) 3:15.84   (Marcos Macedo, Marcelo Chierighini, Henrique Martins, Nicolas Oliveira) 3:17.30   (Clement Lefert, Guillaume Strohmeyer, Joris Hustache, Lorys Bourelly) 3:18.78
Weightlifting:
Men's 69 kg:  Deni  321 kg  Won Jeong-sik  318 kg  Mohamed Sultan  312 kg
Women's 58 kg:  O Jong-Ae  220 kg  Liqin Luo  211 kg  Lara Monica Dominguez  201 kg
Men's 77 kg:  Aghasi Aghasyan  337 kg  Viacheslav Lastukhin  332 kg  Victor Kravchenko  331 kg

August 14, 2011 (Sunday)

Auto racing
Sprint Cup Series:
Heluva Good! Sour Cream Dips at The Glen in Watkins Glen, New York: Postponed to 10:00 am EDT August 15 due to rain.
IndyCar Series:
MoveThatBlock.com Indy 225 in Loudon, New Hampshire: (1) Ryan Hunter-Reay  (Andretti Autosport) (2) Oriol Servià  (Newman/Haas Racing) (3) Scott Dixon  (Chip Ganassi Racing)
Drivers' championship standings (after 13 of 18 races): (1) Dario Franchitti  (Chip Ganassi Racing) 443 points (2) Will Power  (Team Penske) 396 (3) Dixon 370

Badminton
World Championships in London, England:
Men's singles: Lin Dan  def. Lee Chong Wei  20–22, 21–14, 23–21
Lin wins his fourth world title in six years.
Women's singles: Wang Yihan  def. Cheng Shao-chieh  21–15, 21–10
Wang wins her first world title.
Men's doubles: Cai Yun /Fu Haifeng  def. Ko Sung-hyun /Yoo Yeon-seong  24–22, 21–16
Cai and Fu win their fourth world title in six years.
Women's doubles: Wang Xiaoli /Yu Yang  def. Tian Qing /Zhao Yunlei  22–20, 21–11
Wang and Yu both win their first world title.
Mixed doubles: Zhang Nan /Zhao Yunlei  def. Chris Adcock /Imogen Bankier  21–15, 21–7
Zhang and Zhao both win their first world title.

Basketball
FIBA Europe Under-18 Championship for Women in Oradea, Romania:
Bronze medal game:   85–69 
Final:   77–49  
Belgium win the title for the first time.

Cricket
Australia in Sri Lanka:
2nd ODI in Colombo:  208 (49.3 overs);  211/2 (38.2 overs). Australia win by 8 wickets; lead 5-match series 2–0.
Bangladesh in Zimbabwe:
2nd ODI in Harare:  188 (47.3 overs; Brian Vitori 5/20);  191/3 (44.1 overs). Zimbabwe win by 7 wickets; lead 5-match series 2–0.

Cycling
UCI World Tour:
Eneco Tour, stage 6:  Edvald Boasson Hagen   4h 53' 06"  Manuel Antonio Cardoso  s.t.  Lars Boom  s.t.
Final general classification: (1) Boasson Hagen  22h 54' 22" (2) Philippe Gilbert  + 22" (3) David Millar  + 28"
UCI World Tour standings (after 20 of 27 races): (1) Cadel Evans  574 points (2) Gilbert 568 (3) Alberto Contador  471
UCI Mountain Bike World Cup in Nové Město na Moravě, Czech Republic:
Men:  Jaroslav Kulhavý  1h 41' 52"  Nino Schurter  + 45"  Julien Absalon  + 54"
Women:  Catharine Pendrel  1h 45' 23"  Julie Bresset  + 59"  Irina Kalentieva  + 1' 49"

Football (soccer)
FIFA U-20 World Cup in Colombia:
Quarter-finals:
 3–2 (a.e.t.)  in Cali
 2–2 (4–2 pen.)  in Pereira
CAF Champions League group stage, matchday 3:
Group A:
Enyimba  2–0  Raja Casablanca
Al-Hilal  2–1  Coton Sport
Standings (after 3 matches): Enyimba, Al-Hilal 7 points, Coton Sport, Raja Casablanca 1.
Group B: Wydad Casablanca  2–2  Espérance ST
Standings (after 3 matches): Espérance ST, Wydad Casablanca 5 points,  Al-Ahly 4,  MC Alger 1.
CAF Confederation Cup group stage, matchday 3:
Group A: ASEC Mimosas  2–1  Kaduna United
Standings (after 3 matches):  Club Africain 5 points,  Inter Luanda, ASEC Mimosas 4, Kaduna United 2.
 Supercopa de España first leg: Real Madrid 2–2 Barcelona

Golf
Men's majors:
PGA Championship in Johns Creek, Georgia, United States:
Leaderboard after final round: (T1) Keegan Bradley  & Jason Dufner  272 (−8) (3) Anders Hansen  273 (−7)
Three-hole playoff: Bradley 10 (−1) [3–3–4] def. Dufner 11 (E) [4–4–3]
Bradley wins in his first major championship appearance.
U.S. Women's Amateur in Barrington, Rhode Island:
Final: Danielle Kang  def. Moriya Jutanugarn  6 & 5
Kang becomes the first player since Kelli Kuehne  to win consecutive titles.

Mixed martial arts
UFC Live: Hardy vs. Lytle in Milwaukee, Wisconsin, United States:
Welterweight bout: Chris Lytle  def. Dan Hardy  via submission (guillotine choke)
Lightweight bout: Benson Henderson  def. Jim Miller  via unanimous decision (30–27, 29–28, 30–26)
Lightweight bout: Donald Cerrone  def. Charles Oliveira  via TKO (punches)
Welterweight bout: Duane Ludwig  def. Amir Sadollah  via unanimous decision (29–28, 29–28, 29–28)

Motorcycle racing
Moto GP:
Czech Republic Grand Prix in Brno, Czech Republic:
MotoGP: (1) Casey Stoner  (Honda) (2) Andrea Dovizioso  (Honda) (3) Marco Simoncelli  (Honda)
Riders' championship standings (after 11 of 18 races): (1) Stoner 218 points (2) Jorge Lorenzo  (Yamaha) 186 (3) Dovizioso 163
Moto2: (1) Andrea Iannone  (Suter) (2) Marc Márquez  (Suter) (3) Stefan Bradl  (Kalex)
Riders' championship standings (after 10 of 17 races): (1) Bradl 183 points (2) Márquez 140 (3) Alex de Angelis  (Motobi) 95
125cc: (1) Sandro Cortese  (Aprilia) (2) Johann Zarco  (Derbi) (3) Alberto Moncayo  (Aprilia)
Riders' championship standings (after 10 of 17 races): (1) Nicolás Terol  (Aprilia) 166 points (2) Zarco 154 (3) Maverick Viñales  (Aprilia) 132

Multi-sport events
Summer Universiade in Shenzhen, China:
Cycling:
Men's BMX:  Evgeniy Kleshchenko  31.654  Kirill Yashkin  32.587  Tautvydas Biknius  32.731
Women's BMX:  Vilma Rimšaitė  37.400  Marina Beskhmelnova  39.275  Margarita Lomakova  39.797
Fencing:
Men's épée individual:  Péter Szényi   Virgile Marchal   Raffaello Marzani  & Anatoliy Herey 
Women's foil individual:  Kamilla Gafurzianova   Jeon Hee-sook   Katarzyna Kryczało  & Julia Biryukova 
Gymnastics:
Men's artistic competition:   (Yodai Hōjō, Hiroki Ishikawa, Ryūzō Sejima, Masayoshi Yamamoto, Shoichi Yamamoto) 269.200 points   (Chen Xuezhang, Cheng Ran, Liu Rongbing, Wang Guanyin, Yang Shengchao) 265.650   (Cristian Bățagă, Marius Berbecar, Ovidiu Buidoso, Vlad Cotuna, Flavius Koczi) 264.650
Judo:
Women's −63 kg:  Esther Stam   Miki Tanaka   Chun Gum Hwang  & Lin Meiling 
Men's −81 kg:  Tomohiro Kawakami   Rustam Alimli   Murat Khabachirov  & Victor Oliveira 
Women's −70 kg:  Kim Polling   Laura Vargas-Koch   Yuko Imai  & Natalia Bordignon 
Men's −90 kg:  Abdul Omarov   Sherali Juraev   Valentin Radu  & Ryohei Anai 
Swimming:
Women's 50m butterfly:  Lu Ying  25.98  Marieke Guehrer  26.24  Alice Mills  26.53
Men's 200m butterfly:  László Cseh  1:55.87  Robert Bollier  1:56.06  Hidemasa Sano  1:56.81
Men's 200m breaststroke:  Glenn Snyders  & Giedrius Titenis  2:10.85  Kazuki Otsuka  2:10.96
Women's 800m freestyle:  Lauren Boyle  8:26.30  Haley Anderson  8:27.11  Melania Costa-Schmid  8:33.66
Men's 200m backstroke:  Ryosuke Irie  1:56.01  Rexford Tullius  1:58.66  Gareth Kean  1:58.74
Women's 4 × 100 m freestyle relay:   (Cate Campbell, Mills, Jessica Morrison, Guehrer) 3:40.03   (Kate Dwelley, Felicia Lee, Shannon Vreeland, Megan Romano) 3:40.19   (Zhu Qianwei, Lu, Liu Jing, Tang Yi) 3:40.29
Weightlifting:
Women's 53 kg:  Jing Ji  222 kg  Hsu Shu-ching  207 kg  Pramsiri Bunphithak  205 kg
Men's 62 kg:  Eko Yuli Irawan  310 kg  Chen Meilong  285 kg  Withawat Kritphet  283 kg

Tennis
ATP World Tour:
Rogers Cup in Montreal, Canada:
Final: Novak Djokovic  def. Mardy Fish  6–2, 3–6, 6–4
Djokovic wins the tournament for the second time, for his ninth title of the year and 27th of his career. His victory, a fifth Masters 1000 tournament win of the year, sets a record for most Masters 1000 titles won in a season.
WTA Tour:
Rogers Cup in Toronto, Canada:
Final: Serena Williams  def. Samantha Stosur  6–4, 6–2
Williams wins the tournament for the second time, for her second title of the year and 39th of her career.

Volleyball
FIVB World Grand Prix Second Round:
Pool E in Zielona Góra, Poland:
 3–1 
 3–0 
Pool F in Almaty, Kazakhstan:
 0–3 
 1–3 
Pool G in Quanzhou, China:
 0–3 
 0–3 
Pool H in Komaki, Japan:
 3–1 
 1–3 
Standings (after 6 matches): Russia, Brazil 18 points, United States 14, Italy, Serbia 13, Japan 12, South Korea 11, Poland 10, Thailand 9, China 8, Cuba 6, Argentina, Germany 4, Dominican Republic 3, Kazakhstan 1, Peru 0.

August 13, 2011 (Saturday)

Auto racing
Nationwide Series:
Zippo 200 at the Glen in Watkins Glen, New York: (1)  Kurt Busch (Dodge; Penske Racing) (2)  Jimmie Johnson (Chevrolet; JR Motorsports) (3)  Joey Logano (Toyota; Joe Gibbs Racing)
Drivers' championship standings (after 23 of 34 races): (1)  Ricky Stenhouse Jr. (Ford; Roush Fenway Racing) 816 points (2)  Reed Sorenson (Chevrolet; Turner Motorsports) 806 (3)  Elliott Sadler (Chevrolet; Kevin Harvick Incorporated) 792

Cricket
India in England:
3rd Test in Birmingham, day 4:  224 & 244 (55.3 overs);  710/7d. England win by an innings and 242 runs; lead 4-match series 3–0.

Cycling
UCI World Tour:
Eneco Tour, stage 5:  Matteo Bono  4h 12' 14"  Sergey Renev  s.t.  Artem Ovechkin  + 3"
General classification (after stage 5): (1) Edvald Boasson Hagen   18h 01' 26" (2) Philippe Gilbert  + 12" (3) David Millar  + 18"

Equestrianism
Show jumping – Global Champions Tour:
8th Competition in Valkenswaard, Netherlands (CSI 5*):  Beezie Madden  on Cortes 'C  Denis Lynch  on Lantinus  Jur Vrieling  on Bubalu
Standings (after 8 of 10 competitions): (1) Edwina Alexander  228 points (2) Luciana Diniz  192 (3) Ludger Beerbaum  186.5

Football (soccer)
FIFA U-20 World Cup in Colombia:
Quarterfinals: 0–0 (5–4 pen.)  in Cartagena 3–1  in Bogotá
CAF Confederation Cup group stage, matchday 3:
Group A: Club Africain  2–0  Inter Luanda
Standings: Club Africain 5 points (3 matches), Inter Luanda 4 (3),  Kaduna United 2 (2),  ASEC Mimosas 1 (2).
Group B: Maghreb de Fès  1–0  Sunshine Stars
Standings (after 3 matches): Maghreb de Fès 7 points, Sunshine Stars 6,  Motema Pembe 4,  JS Kabylie 0.

Golf
Men's majors:
PGA Championship in Johns Creek, Georgia, United States:
Leaderboard after third round (all USA): (T1) Jason Dufner & Brendan Steele 203 (−7) (3) Keegan Bradley 204 (−6)

Multi-sport events
Summer Universiade in Shenzhen, China:
Cycling:
Men's road race:  Bernhard Oberholzer  3h 50' 22"  Patrick Schelling  s.t.  Genki Yamamoto  + 24"
Women's road race:  Gu Sun-geun  3h 31' 42"  Son Hee-jung  s.t.  Anne Arnouts  s.t.
Fencing:
Men's sabre individual:  Andriy Yagodka   Gu Bon-gil   He Wei  & Massimiliano Murolo 
Women's épée individual:  Lauren Rembi   Olena Kryvytska   Shin A-lam  & Ayaka Shimookawa 
Gymnastics:
Women's artistic competition:   (Yuma Imanishi, Yu Minobe, Keiko Mukumoto, Kyoko Oshima, Mai Yamagishi) 165.200 points   (Yana Demyanchuk, Valentyna Holenkova, Maryna Kostiuchenko, Anastasia Koval, Angelina Kysla) 164.600   (Yulia Lozhechko, Anna Myzdrikova, Alena Polyan, Irina Sazonova, Ekaterina Skorodumova) 162.150
Judo:
Women's −78 kg:  Viktoriia Turks   Géraldine Mentouopou   Zhang Jie  & Jeong Gyeong-mi 
Men's −100 kg:  Ryunosuke Haga   Clément Delvert   Zafar Makhmadov  & Kim Kyeong-tae 
Women's +78 kg:  Qin Qian   Kim Na-young   Emilie Andeol  & Belkıs Zehra Kaya 
Men's +100 kg:  Kim Soo-whan   Maciej Sarnacki   Mathieu Thorel  & Takeshi Ojitani 
Swimming:
Men's 10 km open water:  Simone Ruffini  1:58:00.74  Kirill Abrosimov  2:00:03.35  Yasunari Hirai  2:00:05.54
Women's 10 km open water:  Rachele Bruni  2:06:49.31  Nadine Reichert  2:07:29.21  Alice Franco  2:08:42.77
Weightlifting:
Men's 56 kg:  Lizhi Li  273 kg  Surahmat Bin Suwoto Wijoyo  239 kg  Tan Chi-chung  236 kg
Women's 48 kg:  Xiao Hongyu  188 kg  Ryang Chun-hwa  186 kg  Pensiri Laosirikul  184 kg

Rugby union
Tri Nations Series:
Match 4:  9–14  in Durban
Standings:  9 points (2 matches), Australia 9 (3), South Africa 1 (3).
Mid-year Tests, Week 6:
 27–12  in Lautoka
 19–9  in Cardiff
 19–12  in Bordeaux
 31–24  in Cesena
 7–27  in Glendale, Colorado

Volleyball
FIVB World Grand Prix Second Round:
Pool E in Zielona Góra, Poland:
 0–3 
 2–3 
Pool F in Almaty, Kazakhstan:
 3–0 
 3–2 
Pool G in Quanzhou, China:
 0–3 
 3–2 
Pool H in Komaki, Japan:
 3–0 
 0–3 
Standings (after 5 matches): Russia, Brazil 15 points, United States 14, Italy 13, Serbia 10, Japan 9, China, South Korea 8, Poland 7, Thailand, Cuba 6, Argentina 4, Dominican Republic 3, Germany, Kazakhstan 1, Peru 0.

 

August 12, 2011 (Friday)

Cricket
India in England:
3rd Test in Birmingham, day 3:  224 & 35/1 (12 overs);  710/7d (188.1 overs; Alastair Cook 294, Eoin Morgan 104). India trail by 451 runs with 9 wickets remaining.
England achieve their third-highest innings total, and highest since 1938.
Bangladesh in Zimbabwe:
1st ODI in Harare:  184 (48.4 overs; Brian Vitori 5/30);  186/6 (41.2 overs). Zimbabwe win by 4 wickets; lead 5-match series 1–0.Cycling
UCI World Tour:
Eneco Tour, stage 4:  Jesse Sergent  17' 55"  Alex Rasmussen  + 14"  Jürgen Roelandts  + 20"
General classification (after stage 4): (1) Edvald Boasson Hagen  25px 13h 49' 06" (2) Philippe Gilbert  + 12" (3) David Millar  + 18"

Football (soccer)
CAF Champions League group stage, matchday 3:
Group B: Al-Ahly  2–0  MC Alger
Standings:  Wydad Casablanca 4 points (2 matches), Al-Ahly 4 (3),  Espérance ST 4 (2), MC Alger 1 (3).
CAF Confederation Cup group stage, matchday 3:
Group B: JS Kabylie  0–2  Motema Pembe
Standings:  Sunshine Stars 6 points (2 matches),  Maghreb de Fès 4 (2), Motema Pembe 4 (3), JS Kabylie 0 (3).

Golf
Men's majors:
PGA Championship in Johns Creek, Georgia, United States:
Leaderboard after second round (USA unless stated): (T1) Keegan Bradley & Jason Dufner 135 (−5) (T3) Jim Furyk, D. A. Points, John Senden  & Scott Verplank 136 (−4)

Volleyball
FIVB World Grand Prix Second Round:
Pool E in Zielona Góra, Poland:
 3–0 
 2–3 
Pool F in Almaty, Kazakhstan:
 2–3 
 0–3 
Pool G in Quanzhou, China:
 0–3 
 3–0 
Pool H in Komaki, Japan:
 3–0 
 3–1 
Standings (after 4 matches): Russia, Brazil 12 points, United States, Italy 11, Japan 9, Poland, Serbia 7, China 6, Thailand, South Korea, Cuba 5, Dominican Republic 3, Argentina 2, Kazakhstan 1, Germany, Peru 0.

August 11, 2011 (Thursday)

Cricket
India in England:
3rd Test in Birmingham, day 2:  224;  456/3 (115 overs; Alastair Cook 182*). England lead by 232 runs with 7 wickets remaining in the 1st innings.

Cycling
UCI World Tour:
Eneco Tour, stage 3:  Philippe Gilbert  4h 54' 53"  Grega Bole  + 8"  Ben Hermans  + 8"
General classification (after stage 3): (1) Gilbert  13h 30' 34" (2) Edvald Boasson Hagen  25px + 5" (3) David Millar  + 13"

Football (soccer)
Copa Sudamericana:
First stage, second leg (first leg score in parentheses): The Strongest  2–1 (0–2)  Olimpia. 3–3 on points; Olimpia win 3–2 on aggregate.
Second stage, first leg: Vasco da Gama  2–0  Palmeiras

Golf
Men's majors:
PGA Championship in Johns Creek, Georgia, United States:
Leaderboard after first round (all USA): (1) Steve Stricker 63 (−7) (2) Jerry Kelly 65 (−5) (3) Shaun Micheel 66 (−4)
Stricker becomes the 23rd player to shoot 63 at a major championship.

 

August 10, 2011 (Wednesday)

Cricket
India in England:
3rd Test in Birmingham, day 1:  224 (62.2 overs);  84/0 (25 overs). England trail by 140 runs with 10 wickets remaining in the 1st innings.
Australia in Sri Lanka:
1st ODI in Kandy:  191 (41.1 overs; Mitchell Johnson 6/31);  192/3 (38.1 overs). Australia win by 7 wickets; lead 5-match series 1–0.Cycling
UCI World Tour:
Eneco Tour, stage 2:  André Greipel  4h 07' 21"  Tyler Farrar  s.t.  Edvald Boasson Hagen  s.t.
General classification (after stage 2): (1) Taylor Phinney  25px 8h 35' 38" (2) Boasson Hagen  + 3" (3) David Millar  + 8"

Football (soccer)
FIFA U-20 World Cup in Colombia:
Round of 16: 1–0  in Armenia 0–0 (7–6 pen.)  in Manizales 3–0  in Barranquilla 1–0  in Cartagena
UEFA Euro 2012 qualifying, matchday 8:
Group C:  4–0 
Standings:  16 points (6 matches),  11 (7), Northern Ireland 9 (6),  8 (6),  7 (7), Faroe Islands 4 (8).
Friendly internationals (top 10 in FIFA World Rankings):
(8)  2–1 (1) 
(6)  – (2)  — cancelled due to rioting
(3)  3–2 (4) 
(7)  5–0 
 0–0 (9) 
Recopa Sudamericana First leg: Independiente  2–1  Internacional
Copa Sudamericana Second stage, first leg:
Atlético Mineiro  1–2  Botafogo
Ceará  2–1  São Paulo
Flamengo  1–0  Atlético Paranaense

Snooker
Players Tour Championship – Event 2 in Gloucester, England:
Final: Ding Junhui  0–4 Judd Trump 
Trump wins his fifth professional title.
Order of Merit (after 2 of 12 events): (1) Ronnie O'Sullivan  11,500 (2) Trump 10,000 (3) Joe Perry  5,200

Volleyball
FIVB Men's Junior World Championship in Rio de Janeiro, Brazil:
3rd place match:   3–1 
Final:   2–3  Russia win the title for the eighth time.

 

August 9, 2011 (Tuesday)

Cricket
ICC Intercontinental Cup One-Day:
4th ODI in Toronto:  150 (18.3/20 overs);  133/9 (20 overs). Afghanistan win by 17 runs.Standings (after 2 matches): , Afghanistan,  4 points,  2, Canada,  0.

Cycling
UCI World Tour:
Eneco Tour, stage 1:  André Greipel  4h 21' 20"  Denis Galimzyanov  s.t.  Tyler Farrar  s.t.
General classification (after stage 1): (1) Taylor Phinney  25px 4h 28' 17" (2) Edvald Boasson Hagen  + 7" (3) David Millar  + 8"

Football (soccer)
FIFA U-20 World Cup in Colombia:
Round of 16: 1–0  in Cali 2–1  in Medellín
 0–0 (0–3 pen.)  in Pereira 3–2  in Bogotá
Copa Sudamericana First stage first leg: Universidad de Chile  1–0  Fénix

 

August 8, 2011 (Monday)

Cricket
Bangladesh in Zimbabwe:
Only Test in Harare, day 5:  370 & 291/5d;  287 & 244 (57.3 overs). Zimbabwe win by 130 runs.Australia in Sri Lanka:
2nd T20I in Kandy:  157/9 (20 overs);  149/9 (20 overs; Ajantha Mendis 6/16). Sri Lanka win by 8 runs; win 2-match series 2–0.Mendis becomes the first bowler to take six wickets in a T20I innings, and the tenth to do so in any Twenty20 game.

Cycling
UCI World Tour:
Eneco Tour, Prologue:  Taylor Phinney  25px 6' 57"  Edvald Boasson Hagen  + 7"  David Millar  + 8"

 

August 7, 2011 (Sunday)

Auto racing
Sprint Cup Series:
Good Sam RV Insurance 500 in Long Pond, Pennsylvania: (1)  Brad Keselowski (Dodge; Penske Racing) (2)  Kyle Busch (Toyota; Joe Gibbs Racing) (3)  Kurt Busch (Dodge; Penske Racing)
Drivers' championship standings (after 21 of 36 races): (1)  Carl Edwards (Ford; Roush Fenway Racing) 720 points (2)  Jimmie Johnson (Chevrolet; Hendrick Motorsports) 711 (3) Kyle Busch 709
IndyCar Series:
Honda Indy 200 in Lexington, Ohio: (1) Scott Dixon  (Chip Ganassi Racing) (2) Dario Franchitti  (Chip Ganassi Racing) (3) Ryan Hunter-Reay  (Andretti Autosport)
Drivers' championship standings (after 12 of 18 races): (1) Franchitti 428 points (2) Will Power  (Team Penske) 366 (3) Dixon 335

Basketball
FIBA Europe Under-16 Championship in Pardubice, Czech Republic:
Bronze place game:   61–53 (OT) 
Final:   67–57  
Croatia win the title for the second consecutive year, and third time overall.

Cricket
Bangladesh in Zimbabwe:
Only Test in Harare, day 4:  370 & 291/5d (92 overs; Brendan Taylor 105*);  287 & 112/3 (30 overs). Bangladesh require another 263 runs with 7 wickets remaining.
ICC Intercontinental Cup One-Day:
3rd ODI in King City, Ontario:  230 (44.5 overs);  213/8 (41.1/43 overs). Afghanistan win by 2 wickets (D/L).Equestrianism
Dublin Horse Show in Dublin, Ireland:
Show jumping Grand Prix of Ireland (CSIO 5*):  Lauren Hough  on Quick Study  Michel Robert  on Kellemoi de Pepita  Pénélope Leprevost  on Mylord Carthago

Football (soccer)
 FA Community Shield in London: Manchester United 3–2 Manchester City
Manchester United win the Shield for the fourth time in five years and 19th time overall.

Golf
World Golf Championships:
WGC-Bridgestone Invitational in Akron, Ohio, United States:
Winner: Adam Scott  263 (−17)
Scott wins his first WGC title, and his eighth PGA Tour title.
PGA Tour:
Reno-Tahoe Open in Reno, Nevada:
Winner: Scott Piercy  273 (−15)
Piercy wins his first PGA Tour title.
Champions Tour:
3M Championship in Blaine, Minnesota:
Winner: Jay Haas  201 (−15)
Haas wins his 15th Champions Tour title.

Horse racing
Canadian Thoroughbred Triple Crown:
Breeders' Stakes in Toronto:  Pender Harbour (trainer): Mike DePaulo; jockey: Luis Contreras)  Crown's Path (trainer: Gregory de Gannes; jockey: Jesse Campbell)  Celtic Conviction (trainer: Michael Doyle; jockey: Emile Ramsammy)
Contreras becomes the first jockey to win the three Triple Crown events in a year on two different horses, having won the Queen's Plate on Inglorious and the Prince of Wales Stakes on Pender Harbour.

Tennis
ATP World Tour:
Legg Mason Tennis Classic in Washington, United States:
Final: Radek Štěpánek  def. Gaël Monfils  6–4, 6–4
Štěpánek wins his fifth ATP Tour title, and first since 2009.
WTA Tour:
Mercury Insurance Open in San Diego, United States:
Final: Agnieszka Radwańska  def. Vera Zvonareva  6–3, 6–4
Radwańska wins her fifth WTA Tour title, and first since 2008.

Triathlon
ITU World Championships, Leg 5 in London, United Kingdom:
Men:  Alistair Brownlee  1:50:09  Alexander Bryukhankov  1:50:34  Jonathan Brownlee  1:51:04
Standings (after 5 of 6 events): (1) Javier Gómez  2660 points (2) Alistair Brownlee 2490 (3) Bryukhankov 2403

Volleyball
FIVB World Grand Prix First Round:
Pool A in Bydgoszcz, Poland:
 1–3 
 2–3 
Pool B in Nakhon Pathom, Thailand:
 0–3 
 3–0 
Pool C in Busan, South Korea:
 0–3 
 3–0 
Pool D in Luohe, China:
 0–3 
 3–0 
Standings (after 3 matches): Russia, Brazil, Italy 9 points, United States 8, Serbia 7, Japan 6, Thailand 5, Cuba, Poland 4, Dominican Republic, China, South Korea 3, Argentina 2, Germany, Kazakhstan, Peru 0.

 

August 6, 2011 (Saturday)

Athletics
IAAF Diamond League:
London Grand Prix in London, United Kingdom:
Men:
200m: Walter Dix  20.16
Mile: Leonel Manzano  3:51.24
400m hurdles: Javier Culson  48.33
4 × 100 m relay:  (Trell Kimmons, Mike Rodgers, Michael Tinsley, Joel Brown) 38.23
Discus throw: Virgilijus Alekna  66.71m
High jump: Andrey Silnov  2.36m
Triple jump: Christian Taylor  17.68m
Women:
100m: Carmelita Jeter  10.93
400m: Sanya Richards-Ross  49.66
1500m: Lisa Dobriskey  4:04.97
5000m: Lauren Fleshman  15:00.57
100m hurdles: Sally Pearson  12.58
3000m steeplechase: Milcah Chemos Cheywa  9:22.80
Shot put: Valerie Adams  20.07m

Auto racing
Nationwide Series:
U.S. Cellular 250 in Newton, Iowa: (1)  Ricky Stenhouse Jr. (Ford; Roush Fenway Racing) (2)  Carl Edwards (Ford; Roush Fenway Racing) (3)  Elliott Sadler (Chevrolet; Kevin Harvick Incorporated)
Drivers' championship standings (after 22 of 34 races): (1) Stenhouse Jr. 787 points (2)  Reed Sorenson (Chevrolet; Turner Motorsports) 775 (3) Sadler 758

Cricket
Bangladesh in Zimbabwe:
Only Test in Harare, day 3:  370 & 92/4 (34.3 overs);  287 (96.2 overs). Zimbabwe lead by 175 runs with 6 wickets remaining.
Australia in Sri Lanka:
1st T20I in Kandy:  198/3 (20 overs; Tillakaratne Dilshan 104*);  163/8 (20 overs). Sri Lanka win by 35 runs; lead 2-match series 1–0.Cycling
UCI World Tour:
Tour de Pologne, stage 7:  Marcel Kittel  2h 50' 00"  Peter Sagan   s.t.  Leigh Howard  s.t.
Final general classification: (1) Sagan 25px 26h 40' 01" (2) Dan Martin  + 5" (3) Marco Marcato  + 7"
UCI World Tour standings (after 19 of 27 races): (1) Cadel Evans  574 points (2) Philippe Gilbert  482 (3) Alberto Contador  471

Equestrianism
Dublin Horse Show in Dublin, Ireland:
Puissance (CSIO 5*):  Rene Tebbel  on Mats' Up du Plessis  six second-placed riders

Football (soccer)
FIFA U-20 World Cup in Colombia: (teams in bold advance to the Round of 16)
Group C: 3–0  in Pereira
 1–5  in Manizales
Final standings: Spain 9 points, Ecuador 4, Costa Rica 3, Australia 1.
Group D: 0–2  in Pereira
 0–1  in Armenia
Final standings: Nigeria 9 points, Saudi Arabia 6, Guatemala 3, Croatia 0.
 Supercoppa Italiana in Beijing, China: Milan 2–1 Internazionale
Milan win the Supercoppa for a record sixth time.

Mixed martial arts
UFC 133 in Philadelphia, Pennsylvania, United States:
Light Heavyweight bout: Rashad Evans  def. Tito Ortiz  via TKO (strikes)
Middleweight bout: Vitor Belfort  def. Yoshihiro Akiyama  via KO (punches)
Welterweight bout: Brian Ebersole  def. Dennis Hallman  via TKO (strikes)
Middleweight bout: Costas Philippou  def. Jorge Rivera  via split decision (28–29, 29–28, 29–28)
Welterweight bout: Rory MacDonald  def. Mike Pyle  via TKO (strikes)

Rugby union
Tri Nations Series:
Match 3:  30–14  in Auckland
Standings (after 2 matches): New Zealand 9 points, Australia 5,  0
Mid-year Tests, Week 5:
 10–6  in Edinburgh
 23–19  in London
 28–22  in Toronto

Surfing
Women's World Tour:
U.S. Open of Surfing in Huntington Beach, United States: (1) Sally Fitzgibbons  (2) Lakey Peterson  (3) Carissa Moore  & Coco Ho 
Final standings: (1) Moore 55,000 points (2) Fitzgibbons 51,650 (3) Stephanie Gilmore  40,550
Moore wins the title for the first time.

Tennis
ATP World Tour:
Bet-at-home.com Cup in Kitzbühel, Austria:
Final: Robin Haase  def. Albert Montañés  6–4, 4–6, 6–1
Haase wins his first ATP Tour title.

Triathlon
ITU World Championships, Leg 5 in London, United Kingdom:
Women:  Helen Jenkins  2:00:34  Gwen Jorgensen  2:00:41  Anja Dittmer  2:00:49
Standings (after 5 of 6 events): (1) Bárbara Riveros Díaz  2498 points (2) Andrea Hewitt  2493 (3) Paula Findlay  2490

Volleyball
FIVB World Grand Prix First Round:
Pool A in Bydgoszcz, Poland:
 2–3 
 3–1 
Pool B in Nakhon Pathom, Thailand:
 0–3 
 2–3 
Pool C in Busan, South Korea:
 0–3 
 3–1 
Pool D in Luohe, China:
 0–3 
 1–3 
Standings (after 2 matches): Russia, Brazil, Italy 6 points, United States, Thailand 5, Poland, Serbia 4, China, Japan, South Korea 3, Dominican Republic 2, Cuba 1, Germany, Argentina, Kazakhstan, Peru 0.

 

August 5, 2011 (Friday)

Athletics
IAAF Diamond League:
London Grand Prix in London, United Kingdom:
Men:
100m: Yohan Blake  9.95
400m: Kirani James  44.61
800m: David Rudisha  1:42.91
3000m: Mo Farah  7:40.15
5000m: Craig Mottram  13:23.97
110m hurdles: Dayron Robles  13.04
3000m steeplechase: Willy Komen  8:21.40
Long jump: Mitchell Watt  8.45m
Women:
200m: Bianca Knight  22.69
800m: Jenny Meadows  1:58.60
400m hurdles: Kaliese Spencer  52.79
4 × 100 m relay:  (Knight, Mikele Barber, Kayla Brookins, [Candyce McGrone) 42.92
Javelin throw: Christina Obergföll  66.74m
Pole vault: Jenn Suhr  4.79m
Triple jump: Olha Saladukha  14.80m

Cricket
Bangladesh in Zimbabwe:
Only Test in Harare, day 2:  370 (131 overs; Hamilton Masakadza 104);  107/3 (46 overs). Bangladesh trail by 263 runs with 7 wickets remaining in the 1st innings.
ICC Intercontinental Cup:
In King City, Ontario, day 4:  293 & 69/1 (11.3 overs);  130 & 231 (f/o, 85.5 overs). Afghanistan win by 9 wickets.Cycling
UCI World Tour:
Tour de Pologne, stage 6:  Dan Martin  5h 41' 05"  Wout Poels  + 1"  Marco Marcato  + 4"
General classification (after stage 6): (1) Martin  23h 50' 06" (2) Peter Sagan   + 3" (3) Marcato + 3"

Equestrianism
Dublin Horse Show in Dublin, Ireland:
Show jumping – FEI Nations Cup:
Nations Cup of Ireland (CSIO 5*):   (Nick Skelton, Michael Whitaker, Scott Brash, Robert Smith)   (Billy Twomey, Shane Sweetnam, Nicola Fitzgibbon, Denis Lynch)   & 
Standings (after 7 of 8 events): (1)  44 points (2)  40 (3) Great Britain 40

Football (soccer)
FIFA U-20 World Cup in Colombia: (teams in bold advance to the Round of 16)
Group A: 2–0  in Cali 1–0  in Bogotá
Final standings: Colombia 9 points, France 6, South Korea 3, Mali 0.
Group B: 1–0  in Cali
 0–1  in Bogotá
Final standings: Portugal 7 points, Cameroon 4, New Zealand, Uruguay 2.
 Faroe Islands Cup Final: ÍF Fuglafjørður 0–3 EB/StreymurEB/Streymur win the Faroe Islands Cup for the second successive time and fourth time overall.

Volleyball
FIVB World Grand Prix First Round:
Pool A in Bydgoszcz, Poland:
 3–0 
 3–1 
Pool B in Nakhon Pathom, Thailand:
 3–1 
 3–0 
Pool C in Busan, South Korea:
 3–0 
 3–1 
Pool D in Luohe, China:
 2–3 
 3–0 

 

August 4, 2011 (Thursday)

Cricket
Bangladesh in Zimbabwe:
Only Test in Harare, day 1:  264/2 (90 overs); .
ICC Intercontinental Cup:
In King City, Ontario, day 3:  293;  130 (48 overs; Hamid Hassan 7/61) & 176/7 (f/o, 62 overs). Canada lead by 13 runs with 3 wickets remaining.

Cycling
UCI World Tour:
Tour de Pologne, stage 5:   Peter Sagan   4h 52' 26"  Michael Matthews  s.t.  Heinrich Haussler  s.t.
General classification (after stage 5): (1) Sagan  18h 08' 51" (2) Marco Marcato  + 15" (3) Romain Feillu   + 17"

Football (soccer)
FIFA U-20 World Cup in Colombia: (teams in bold advance to the Round of 16)
Group E: 4–0  in Barranquilla 4–0  in Cartagena
Final standings: Brazil, Egypt 7 points, Panama, Austria 1.
Group F: 0–0  in Cartagena 3–0  in Medellín
Final standings: Argentina 7 points, Mexico 4, England 3, North Korea 1.
UEFA Europa League Third qualifying round second leg: (first leg scores in parentheses)
Mladá Boleslav  2–2 (0–3)  AEK Larnaca. AEK Larnaca win 5–2 on aggregate.
Varaždin  1–2 (2–2)  Dinamo București. Dinamo București win 4–3 on aggregate.
Aktobe  1–1 (1–1)  Alania Vladikavkaz. 2–2 on aggregate; Alania Vladikavkaz win 4–2 on penalties.
Elfsborg  1–1 (0–4)  Aalesund. Aalesund win 5–1 on aggregate.
Qarabağ  1–0 (1–4)  Club Brugge. Club Brugge win 4–2 on aggregate.
Strømsgodset  0–2 (1–2)  Atlético Madrid. Atlético Madrid win 4–1 on aggregate.
Sligo Rovers  0–2 (0–0)  Vorskla Poltava. Vorskla Poltava win 2–0 on aggregate.
Gomel  1–3 (1–2)  Bursaspor. Bursaspor win 5–2 on aggregate.Legia Warsaw  0–0 (1–0)  Gaziantepspor. Legia Warsaw win 1–0 on aggregate.Rennes  2–0 (5–2)  Metalurgi Rustavi. Rennes win 7–2 on aggregate.Spartak Trnava  2–1 (1–2)  Levski Sofia. 3–3 on aggregate; Spartak Trnava win 5–4 on penalties.Dinamo Tbilisi  2–0 (4–1)  KR Reykjavík. Dinamo Tbilisi win 6–1 on aggregate.
Senica  0–3 (0–1)  Red Bull Salzburg. Red Bull Salzburg win 4–0 on aggregate.Gaz Metan Mediaș  1–1 (1–1)  Mainz 05. 2–2 on aggregate; Gaz Metan Mediaș win 4–3 on penalties.Helsingborg  3–0 (0–1)  Bnei Yehuda. Helsingborg win 3–1 on aggregate.
Hajduk Split  0–1 (0–1)  Stoke City. Stoke City win 2–0 on aggregate.
Häcken  2–1 (0–3)  Nacional. Nacional win 4–2 on aggregate.
Brøndby  4–2 (0–2)  Ried. 4–4 on aggregate; Ried win on away goals.Maccabi Tel Aviv  6–0 (2–0)  Željezničar. Maccabi Tel Aviv win 8–0 on aggregate.Thun  1–1 (2–2)  Palermo. 3–3 on aggregate; Thun win on away goals.
Lokomotiv Sofia  0–0 (0–0)  Śląsk Wrocław. 0–0 on aggregate; Śląsk Wrocław win 4–3 on penalties.
Westerlo  0–2 (1–3)  Young Boys. Young Boys win 5–1 on aggregate.
Vaduz  2–1 (0–4)  Hapoel Tel Aviv. Hapoel Tel Aviv win 5–2 on aggregate.
ADO Den Haag  1–0 (0–3)  Omonia. Omonia win 3–1 on aggregate.Olympiakos Volou  3–0 (3–0)  Differdange 03. Olympiakos Volou win 6–0 on aggregate.Rabotnički  1–2 (2–0)  Anorthosis. Rabotnički win 3–2 on aggregate.PAOK  3–0 (2–0)  Vålerenga. PAOK win 5–0 on aggregate.Red Star Belgrade  7–0 (2–1)  Ventspils. Red Star Belgrade win 9–1 on aggregate.
Jablonec  1–1 (0–2)  AZ. AZ win 3–1 on aggregate.Fulham  2–0 (0–0)  Split. Fulham win 2–0 on aggregate.
St Patrick's Athletic  1–3 (0–2)  Karpaty Lviv. Karpaty Lviv win 5–1 on aggregate.Heart of Midlothian  4–1 (1–1)  Paks. Heart of Midlothian win 5–2 on aggregate.
Sarajevo  0–2 (0–5)  Sparta Prague. Sparta Prague win 7–0 on aggregate.Austria Wien  3–2 (1–1)  Olimpija Ljubljana. Austria Wien win 4–3 on aggregate.Vitória Guimarães  2–1 (0–0)  Midtjylland. Vitória Guimarães win 2–1 on aggregate.
Copa Sudamericana First stage first leg: Yaracuyanos  1–1  LDU Quito
CONCACAF Champions League Preliminary Round second leg: (first leg score in parentheses)
Alpha United  2–2 (0–8)  Herediano. Herediano win 10–2 on aggregate.
Municipal  2–0 (0–4)  Motagua. Motagua win 4–2 on aggregate.

 

August 3, 2011 (Wednesday)

Cricket
ICC Intercontinental Cup:
In King City, Ontario, day 2:  293;  21/4 (12 overs). Canada trail by 272 runs with 6 wickets remaining in the 1st innings.

Cycling
UCI World Tour:
Tour de Pologne, stage 4:  Peter Sagan  4h 21' 15"  Dan Martin  + 3"  Marco Marcato  + 3"
General classification (after stage 4): (1) Sagan  13h 16' 35" (2) Marcato + 5" (3) Romain Feillu   + 7"

Football (soccer)
FIFA U-20 World Cup in Colombia (teams in bold advance to knockout stage):
Group C in Manizales:
 0–2  2–3 
Standings (after 2 matches): Spain 6 points, Costa Rica 3, Australia, Ecuador 1.
Group D in Armenia: 6–0 
 2–5 Standings (after 2 matches): Nigeria, Saudi Arabia 6 points, Croatia, Guatemala 0.
UEFA Champions League Third qualifying round second leg: (first leg scores in parentheses)Rubin Kazan  2–1 (2–0)  Dynamo Kyiv. Rubin Kazan win 4–1 on aggregate.Malmö FF  1–1 (1–0)  Rangers. Malmö win 2–1 on aggregate.
Vaslui  0–0 (0–2)  Twente. Twente win 2–0 on aggregate.
Slovan Bratislava  0–2 (0–0)  APOEL. APOEL win 2–0 on aggregate.Viktoria Plzeň  3–2 (1–0)  Rosenborg. Viktoria Plzeň win 4–2 on aggregate.Zürich  1–0 (1–1)  Standard Liège. Zürich win 2–1 on aggregate.Wisła Kraków  3–1 (2–1)  Litex Lovech. Wisła Kraków win 5–2 on aggregate.Sturm Graz  1–0 (1–1)  Zestafoni. Sturm Graz win 2–1 on aggregate.
Maribor  1–1 (1–2)  Maccabi Haifa. Maccabi Haifa win 3–2 on aggregate.Dinamo Zagreb  1–0 (2–1)  HJK Helsinki. Dinamo Zagreb win 3–1 on aggregate.
Partizan  1–1 (1–2)  Genk. Genk win 3–2 on aggregate.
Trabzonspor  1–1 (0–2)  Benfica. Benfica win 3–1 on aggregate.
Copa Sudamericana First stage first leg:
San José  0–0  Nacional
Deportivo Quito  1–0  Deportivo Anzoátegui
Olimpia  2–0  The Strongest
CONCACAF Champions League Preliminary Round second leg: (first leg score in parentheses)FC Dallas  1–0 (1–0)  Alianza. Dallas win 2–0 on aggregate.
Tempête  0–2 (0–5)  Morelia. Morelia win 7–0 on aggregate.
Puerto Rico Islanders  3–1 (0–2)  Isidro Metapán. 3–3 on aggregate; Isidro Metapán win on away goals.Seattle Sounders  2–0 (a.e.t.) (0–1)  San Francisco. Seattle Sounders win 2–1 on aggregate.
Olimpia  2–1 (1–3)  Santos Laguna. Santos Laguna win 4–3 on aggregate.

 

August 2, 2011 (Tuesday)

Cricket
ICC Intercontinental Cup:
In King City, Ontario, day 1:  293 (81.1 overs);  21/4 (12 overs). Canada trail by 272 runs with 6 wickets remaining in the 1st innings.

Cycling
UCI World Tour:
Tour de Pologne, stage 3:  Marcel Kittel  25px 3h 09' 29"  Romain Feillu  s.t.  Jonas Aaen Jørgensen  s.t.
General classification (after stage 3): (1) Kittel 25px 8h 55' 00" (2) Adrian Kurek  (Team Poland BGŻ)  + 17" (3) Gianluca Maggiore  + 22"

Football (soccer)
FIFA U-20 World Cup in Colombia (team in bold advances to knockout stage):
Group A in Bogotá:
 3–1  2–0 
Standings (after 2 matches): Colombia 6 points, South Korea, France 3, Mali 0.
Group B in Cali:
 1–1 
 1–0 
Standings (after 2 matches): Portugal 4 points, New Zealand, Uruguay 2, Cameroon 1.
UEFA Champions League Third qualifying round second leg: (first leg scores in parentheses)BATE Borisov  3–1 (0–0)  Ekranas. BATE Borisov win 3–1 on aggregate.
Shamrock Rovers  0–2 (0–1)  Copenhagen. Copenhagen win 3–0 on aggregate.
Panathinaikos  3–4 (1–1)  Odense. Odense win 5–4 on aggregate.
Copa Sudamericana First stage first leg:
Universidad César Vallejo  1–1  Santa Fe
Bella Vista  1–1  Universidad Católica
CONCACAF Champions League Preliminary Round second leg: (first leg score in parentheses)
Real Estelí  1–2 (1–2)  Toronto FC. Toronto win 4–2 on aggregate.

 

August 1, 2011 (Monday)

Cricket
India in England:
2nd Test in Nottingham, day 4:  221 & 544 (120.2 overs);  288 & 158 (47.4 overs; Tim Bresnan 5/48). England win by 319 runs; lead 4-match series 2–0.Cycling
UCI World Tour:
Tour de Pologne, stage 2:  Marcel Kittel  25px 3h 38' 35"  Heinrich Haussler  s.t.  Graeme Brown  s.t.
General classification (after stage 2): (1) Kittel 25px 5h 45' 41" (2) Adrian Kurek  (Team Poland BGŻ)  + 7" (3) Haussler + 14"

Football (soccer)
FIFA U-20 World Cup in Colombia:
Group E in Barranquilla:
 1–0 
 3–0 
Standings (after 2 matches): Brazil, Egypt 4 points, Panama, Austria 1.
Group F in Medellín:
 3–0 
 0–0 
Standings (after 2 matches): Argentina 4 points, Mexico 3, England 2, North Korea 1.
UEFA European Under-19 Championship in Romania:
Final in Chiajna:   2–3 (a.e.t.)  '
Spain win the title for the fifth time.

References

8